The birds of Asia are diverse. The avifauna of Asia includes a total of 3845 species.

The taxonomy of this list adheres to James Clements' Birds of the World: A Checklist, 2022 edition. Taxonomic changes are on-going. As more research is gathered from studies of distribution, behaviour, and DNA, the order and number of families and species may change. Furthermore, different approaches to ornithological nomenclature have led to concurrent systems of classification (see Sibley-Ahlquist taxonomy).

The area includes Russia east of the Ural River and Ural Mountains and the Russian Arctic islands east of Novaya Zemlya, as well as Kazakhstan, Georgia, Azerbaijan, and Turkey. The area is separated from Africa by the Suez Canal. In the Indian Ocean it includes Sri Lanka, Lakshadweep (the Laccadive Islands), the Andaman and Nicobar Islands. It includes the Russian islands in the Bering Sea and North Pacific. Japan, the Izu Islands, the Ryukyu Islands, Taiwan, the Philippines, Malaysia and Indonesia.

The following tags have been used to highlight several categories. The commonly occurring native species do not fall into any of these categories.

 (A) Accidental - a species that rarely or accidentally occurs in Asia
 (I) Introduced - a species introduced to Asia as a consequence, direct or indirect, of human actions
 (Ex) Extirpated - a species that no longer occurs in Asia although populations exist elsewhere
 (X) Extinct - a species or subspecies that no longer exists.

Ostriches
Order: StruthioniformesFamily: Struthionidae

The ostrich is a flightless bird native to Africa. It is the largest living species of bird. It is distinctive in its appearance, with a long neck and legs and the ability to run at high speeds.

Common ostrich, Struthio camelus 
Arabian ostrich, Struthio camelus syriacus (X)
North African ostrich, Struthio camelus camelus (I)

Cassowaries and emu
Order: StruthioniformesFamily: Casuariidae

The cassowaries are large flightless birds native to Australia and New Guinea.

Southern cassowary, Casuarius casuarius
Dwarf cassowary, Casuarius bennetii
Northern cassowary, Casuarius unappendiculatus

Magpie goose
Order: AnseriformesFamily: Anseranatidae

The family contains a single species, the magpie goose. It was an early and distinctive offshoot of the anseriform family tree, diverging after the screamers and before all other ducks, geese and swans, sometime in the late Cretaceous.

Magpie goose, Anseranas semipalmata

Ducks, geese, and waterfowl
Order: AnseriformesFamily: Anatidae

Anatidae includes the ducks and most duck-like waterfowl, such as geese and swans. These birds are adapted to an aquatic existence with webbed feet, flattened bills, and feathers that are excellent at shedding water due to an oily coating.

Spotted whistling-duck, Dendrocygna guttata
Plumed whistling-duck, Dendrocygna eytoni (A)
Fulvous whistling-duck, Dendrocygna bicolor
Wandering whistling-duck, Dendrocygna arcuata
Lesser whistling-duck, Dendrocygna javanica
White-faced whistling-duck, Dendrocygna viduata
Bar-headed goose, Anser indicus
Emperor goose, Anser canagica
Snow goose, Anser caerulescens
Ross's goose, Anser rossii (A)
Graylag goose, Anser anser
Swan goose, Anser cygnoides
Greater white-fronted goose, Anser albifrons
Lesser white-fronted goose, Anser erythropus
Taiga bean-goose, Anser fabalis
Tundra bean-goose, Anser serrirostris
Pink-footed goose, Anser brachyrhynchus (A)
Brant, Branta bernicla
Barnacle goose, Branta leucopsis
Cackling goose, Branta hutchinsii
Canada goose, Branta canadensis (A)
Red-breasted goose, Branta ruficollis
Mute swan, Cygnus olor
Black swan, Cygnus atratus
Trumpeter swan, Cygnus buccinator
Tundra swan, Cygnus columbianus
Whooper swan, Cygnus cygnus
Black-necked swan, Cygnus melancoryphus
Knob-billed duck, Sarkidiornis melanotos
Radjah shelduck, Radjah radjah
Egyptian goose, Alopochen aegyptiaca
Ruddy shelduck, Tadorna ferruginea
Australian shelduck, Tadorna tadornoides
Common shelduck, Tadorna tadorna
Crested shelduck, Tadorna cristata
Paradise shelduck, Tadorna variegata
Green pygmy-goose, Nettapus pulchellus
Cotton pygmy-goose, Nettapus coromandelianus
Mandarin duck, Aix galericulata
Wood duck, Aix sponsa
Salvadori's teal, Salvadorina waigiuensis
Baikal teal, Sibirionetta formosa
Garganey, Spatula querquedula
Blue-winged teal, Spatula discors (A)
Northern shoveler, Spatula clypeata
Australian shoveler, Spatula rhynchotis
Blue-billed teal, Spatula hottentota
Silver teal, Spatula versicolor
Cinnamon teal, Spatula cyanoptera
Cape shoveler, Spatula smithii
Red shoveler, Spatula platalea
Gadwall, Mareca strepera
Falcated duck, Mareca falcata
Eurasian wigeon, Mareca penelope
American wigeon, Mareca americana (A)
Chiloe wigeon, Mareca sibilatrix
Pacific black duck, Anas superciliosa
Philippine duck, Anas luzonica
Indian spot-billed duck, Anas poecilorhyncha
Eastern spot-billed duck, Anas zonorhyncha
Mallard, Anas platyrhynchos
American black duck, Anas rubripes (A)
Northern pintail, Anas acuta
Green-winged teal, Anas crecca
Andaman teal, Anas albogularis
Sunda teal, Anas gibberifrons
Gray teal, Anas gracilis
White-cheeked pintail, Anas bahamensis
Chestnut teal, Anas castanea
Cape teal, Anas capensis (A)
Red-billed duck, Anas erythrorhyncha
Yellow-billed duck, Anas undulata
Yellow-billed pintail, Anas georgica 
Yellow-billed teal, Anas flavirostris
Hawaiian duck, Anas wyvilliana
Laysan duck, Anas laysanensis
Marbled teal, Marmaronetta angustirostris
Pink-headed duck, Rhodonessa caryophyllacea
White-winged duck, Asarcornis scutulata
Red-crested pochard, Netta rufina
Southern pochard, Netta erythrophthalma
Rosy-billed pochard, Netta peposaca
Canvasback, Aythya valisineria
Redhead, Aythya americana
Common pochard, Aythya ferina
Ring-necked duck, Aythya collaris (A)
Ferruginous duck, Aythya nyroca
Baer's pochard, Aythya baeri
Hardhead, Aythya australis
Tufted duck, Aythya fuligula
Greater scaup, Aythya marila
Lesser scaup, Aythya affinis
New Zealand scaup, Aythya novaeseelandiae
Steller's eider, Polysticta stelleri
Spectacled eider, Somateria fischeri
King eider, Somateria spectabilis
Common eider, Somateria mollissima
Harlequin duck, Histrionicus histrionicus
Surf scoter, Melanitta perspicillata
Velvet scoter, Melanitta fusca
White-winged scoter, Melanitta deglandi (A)
Stejneger's scoter, Melanitta stejnegeri
Common scoter, Melanitta nigra
Black scoter, Melanitta americana
Long-tailed duck, Clangula hyemalis
Bufflehead, Bucephala albeola
Common goldeneye, Bucephala clangula
Barrow's goldeneye, Bucephala islandica
Smew, Mergellus albellus
Hooded merganser, Lophodytes cucullatus (A)
Common merganser, Mergus merganser
Red-breasted merganser, Mergus serrator
Scaly-sided merganser, Mergus squamatus
Ruddy duck, Oxyura jamaicensis (I)
White-headed duck, Oxyura leucocephala
Blue-billed duck, Oxyura australis
Maccoa duck, Oxyura maccoa
Lake duck, Oxuyra vittata
Maned duck, Chenonetta jubata 
Spur-winged goose, Plectropterus gambensis

Megapodes
Order: GalliformesFamily: Megapodiidae

The Megapodiidae are stocky, medium-large chicken-like birds with small heads and large feet. All but the malleefowl occupy jungle habitats and most have brown or black colouring.

Wattled brushturkey, Aepypodius arfakinus
Waigeo brushturkey, Aepypodius bruijni
Red-billed brushturkey, Talegalla cuvieri
Yellow-legged brushturkey, Talegalla fuscirostris
Red-legged brushturkey, Talegalla jobiensis
Maleo, Macrocephalon maleo
Moluccan scrubfowl, Eulipoa wallacei
Nicobar scrubfowl, Megapodius nicobariensis
Tabon scrubfowl, Megapodius cumingii
Sula scrubfowl, Megapodius bernsteinii
Tanimbar scrubfowl, Megapodius tenimberensis
Dusky scrubfowl, Megapodius freycinet
Biak scrubfowl, Megapodius geelvinkianus
Forsten's scrubfowl, Megapodius forsteni
New Guinea scrubfowl, Megapodius decollatus
Orange-footed scrubfowl, Megapodius reinwardt
Melanesian scrubfowl, Megapodius eremita
Vanuatu scrubfowl, Megapodius layardi
Tongan megapode,  Megapodius pritchardii
Micronesian scrubfowl, Megapodius laperouse
Malleefowl, Leipoa ocellata

Guineafowl
Order: GalliformesFamily: Numididae

The guineafowl are a family of birds native to Africa. They typically eat insects and seeds, are ground-nesting, and resemble partridges, except with featherless heads.

Helmeted guineafowl, Numida meleagris (I)
Vulturine guineafowl, Acryllium vulturinum

New World quail
Northern bobwhite, Colinus virginianus (I)

Pheasants, grouse, and allies 
Order: GalliformesFamily: Phasianidae

The Phasianidae are a family of terrestrial birds. In general, they are plump (although they vary in size) and have broad, relatively short wings.

Ferruginous partridge, Caloperdix oculeus
Crested partridge, Rollulus rouloul
Black partridge, Melanoperdix niger
Hill partridge, Arborophila torqueola
Sichuan partridge, Arborophila rufipectus
Chestnut-breasted partridge, Arborophila mandellii
White-necklaced partridge, Arborophila gingica
Rufous-throated partridge, Arborophila rufogularis
White-cheeked partridge, Arborophila atrogularis
Taiwan partridge, Arborophila crudigularis
Hainan partridge, Arborophila ardens
Chestnut-bellied partridge, Arborophila javanica
Malayan partridge, Arborophila campbelli
Roll's partridge, Arborophila rolli
Sumatran partridge, Arborophila sumatrana
Gray-breasted partridge, Arborophila orientalis
Bar-backed partridge, Arborophila brunneopectus
Orange-necked partridge, Arborophila davidi
Chestnut-headed partridge, Arborophila cambodiana
Red-breasted partridge, Arborophila hyperythra
Red-billed partridge, Arborophila rubrirostris
Scaly-breasted partridge, Tropicoperdix chloropus
Chestnut-necklaced partridge, Tropicoperdix charltonii
Sabah partridge, Tropicoperdix graydoni
Long-billed partridge, Rhizothera longirostris
Dulit Partridge, Rhizothera dulitensis
Vietnamese crested argus, Rheinardia ocellata
Malayan crested argus, Rheinardia nigrescens
Great argus, Argusianus argus
Indian peafowl, Pavo cristatus
Green peafowl, Pavo muticus (A)
Crimson-headed partridge, Haematortyx sanguiniceps
Red spurfowl, Galloperdix spadicea
Painted spurfowl, Galloperdix lunulata
Sri Lanka spurfowl, Galloperdix bicalcarata
Palawan peacock-pheasant, Polyplectron napoleonis
Malayan peacock-pheasant, Polyplectron malacense
Bornean peacock-pheasant, Polyplectron schleiermacheri
Germain's peacock-pheasant, Polyplectron germaini
Hainan peacock-pheasant, Polyplectron katsumatae
Mountain peacock-pheasant, Polyplectron inopinatum
Bronze-tailed peacock-pheasant, Polyplectron chalcurum
Gray peacock-pheasant, Polyplectron bicalcaratum
See-see partridge, Ammoperdix griseogularis
Sand partridge, Ammoperdix heyi
Brown quail, Synoicus ypsilophorus
Blue-breasted quail, Synoicus chinensis
Blue quail, Synoicus adansonii
Snow Mountain quail, Synoicus monorthonyx
Japanese quail, Coturnix japonica
Common quail, Coturnix coturnix
Harlequin quail, Coturnix delegorguei
Rain quail, Coturnix coromandelica
Stubble quail, Corurnix pectoralis
Rock partridge, Alectoris gracea
Chukar, Alectoris chukar
Philby's partridge, Alectoris philbyi
Przevalski's partridge, Alectoris magna
Arabian partridge, Alectoris melanocephala
Barbary partridge, Alectoris barbara
Red-legged partridge, Alectoris rufa
Caucasian snowcock, Tetraogallus caucasicus
Caspian snowcock, Tetraogallus caspius
Altai snowcock, Tetraogallus altaicus
Tibetan snowcock, Tetraogallus tibetanus
Himalayan snowcock, Tetraogallus himalayensis
Jungle bush-quail, Perdicula asiatica
Rock bush-quail, Perdicula argoondah
Painted bush-quail, Perdicula erythrorhyncha
Manipur bush-quail, Perdicula manipurensis
Himalayan quail, Ophrysia superciliosa
Black francolin, Francolinus francolinus
Painted francolin, Francolinus pictus
Chinese francolin, Francolinus pintadeanus
Mountain bamboo-partridge, Bambusicola fytchii
Chinese bamboo-partridge, Bambusicola thoracicus
Taiwan bamboo-partridge, Bambusicola sonorivox
Red junglefowl, Gallus gallus 
Gray junglefowl, Gallus sonneratii
Sri Lanka junglefowl, Gallus lafayettii
Green junglefowl, Gallus varius
Blood pheasant, Ithaginis cruentus
Himalayan monal, Lophophorus impejanus
Sclater's monal, Lophophorus sclateri
Chinese monal, Lophophorus lhuysii
Snow partridge, Lerwa lerwa
Verreaux's partridge, Tetraophasis obscurus
Szechenyi's partridge, Tetraophasis szechenyii
Western tragopan, Tragopan melanocephalus
Satyr tragopan, Tragopan satyra
Blyth's tragopan, Tragopan blythii
Temminck's tragopan, Tragopan temminckii
Cabot's tragopan, Tragopan caboti
Reeves's pheasant, Syrmaticus reevesii
Copper pheasant, Syrmaticus soemmerringii
Mikado pheasant, Syrmaticus mikado
Elliot's pheasant, Syrmaticus ellioti
Hume's pheasant, Syrmaticus humiae
Golden pheasant, Chrysolophus pictus
Lady Amherst's pheasant, Chrysolophus amherstiae
Ring-necked pheasant, Phasianus colchicus
Tibetan eared-pheasant, Crossoptilon harmani
White eared-pheasant, Crossoptilon crossoptilon
Brown eared-pheasant, Crossoptilon mantchuricum
Blue eared-pheasant, Crossoptilon auritum
Cheer pheasant, Catreus wallichii
Silver pheasant, Lophura nycthemera
Kalij pheasant, Lophura leucomelanos
Siamese fireback, Lophura diardi
Bulwer's pheasant, Lophura bulweri
Edwards's pheasant, Lophura edwardsi
Swinhoe's pheasant, Lophura swinhoii
Salvadori's pheasant, Lophura inornata
Malayan crestless fireback, Lophura erythrophthalma
Bornean crestless fireback, Lophura pyronota
Malayan crested fireback, Lophura rufa
Bornean crested fireback, Lophura ignita
Gray partridge, Perdix perdix
Daurian partridge, Perdix dauurica (Ex)
Tibetan partridge, Perdix hodgsoniae
Koklass pheasant, Pucrasia macrolopha
Black-billed capercaillie, Tetrao urogalloides
Western capercaillie, Tetrao urogallus
Black grouse,  Lyrurus tetrix
Caucasian grouse, Lyrurus mlokosiewiczi
Hazel grouse, Tetrastes bonasia
Severtzov's grouse, Tetrastes sewerzowi
Siberian grouse, Falcipennis falcipennis
Willow ptarmigan, Lagopus lagopus
Rock ptarmigan, Lagopus muta
Yellow-necked francolin, Pternistis leucoscepus
Red-necked francolin, Pternistis afer
Erckel's francolin, Pternistis erckelii
Gray francolin, Ortygornis pondicerianus

Flamingos
Order: PhoenicopteriformesFamily: Phoenicopteridae

Flamingos filter-feed on shellfish and algae. Their oddly shaped beaks are specially adapted to separate mud and silt from the food they consume and, uniquely, are used upside-down.

Greater flamingo, Phoenicopterus roseus
Lesser flamingo, Phoenicopterus minor

Grebes
Order: PodicipediformesFamily: Podicipedidae

Grebes are small to medium-large freshwater diving birds. They have lobed toes and are excellent swimmers and divers. However, they have their feet placed far back on the body, making them quite ungainly on land.

Little grebe, Tachybaptus ruficollis
Australasian grebe, Tachybaptus novaehollandiae
Horned grebe, Podiceps auritus
Red-necked grebe, Podiceps grisegena
Great crested grebe, Podiceps cristatus
Eared grebe, Podiceps nigricollis
Hoary-headed grebe, Poliocephalus poliocephalus
Pied-billed grebe, Podilymbus podiceps

Pigeons and doves
Order: ColumbiformesFamily: Columbidae

Pigeons and doves are stout-bodied birds with short necks and short slender bills with a fleshy cere.

Rock pigeon, Columba livia
Hill pigeon, Columba rupestris
Snow pigeon, Columba leuconota
Speckled pigeon, Columba guinea (A)
Stock dove, Columba oenas
Yellow-eyed pigeon, Columba eversmanni
Common wood-pigeon, Columba palumbus
Rameron pigeon, Columba arquatrix
Speckled wood-pigeon, Columba hodgsonii
Ashy wood-pigeon, Columba pulchricollis
Nilgiri wood-pigeon, Columba elphinstonii
Sri Lanka wood-pigeon, Columba torringtoniae
Pale-capped pigeon, Columba punicea
Silvery wood-pigeon, Columba argentina
Andaman wood-pigeon, Columba palumboides
Japanese wood-pigeon, Columba janthina
Ryukyu pigeon, Columba jouyi
Bonin pigeon, Columba versicolor
Metallic pigeon, Columba vitiensis
Yellow-legged pigeon, Columba pallidiceps
White-headed pigeon, Columba leucomela
Trocaz pigeon, Columba trocaz
Bolle's pigeon, Columba bollii
Laurel pigeon, Columba junoniae
European turtle-dove, Streptopelia turtur
Dusky turtle-dove, Streptopelia lugens
Oriental turtle-dove, Streptopelia orientalis
Sunda collared-dove, Streptopelia bitorquata
Philippine collared-dove, Streptopelia dusumieri
Eurasian collared-dove, Streptopelia decaocto
Burmese collared-dove, Streptopelia xanthocycla
African collared-dove, Streptopelia roseogrisea
Red-eyed dove, Streptopelia semitorquata
Red collared-dove, Streptopelia tranquebarica
Malagasy turtle-dove, Streptopelia picturata
Mourning collared-dove, Streptopelia decipiens
Spotted dove, Spilopelia chinensis
Laughing dove, Spilopelia senegalensis
Barred cuckoo-dove, Macropygia unchall
Flores Sea cuckoo-dove, Macropygia macassariensis
Timor cuckoo-dove, Macropygia magna
Tanimbar cuckoo-dove, Macropygia timorlaoensis
Amboyna cuckoo-dove, Macropygia amboinensis
Sultan's cuckoo-dove, Macropygia doreya
Andaman cuckoo-dove, Macropygia rufipennis
Philippine cuckoo-dove, Macropygia tenuirostris
Ruddy cuckoo-dove, Macropygia emiliana
Enggano cuckoo-dove, Macropygia cinnamomea
Barusan cuckoo-dove, Macropygia modiglianii
Black-billed cuckoo-dove, Macropygia nigrirostris
Mackinlay's cuckoo-dove, Macropygia mackinlayi
Little cuckoo-dove, Macropygia ruficeps
Brown cuckoo-dove, Macropygia phasianella
Great cuckoo-dove, Reinwardtoena reinwardti
Pied cuckoo-dove, Reinwardtoena browni
Crested cuckoo-dove, Reinwardtoena crassirostris
White-faced cuckoo-dove, Turacoena manadensis
Sula cuckoo-dove, Turacoena sulaensis
Slaty cuckoo-dove, Turacoena modesta
Namaqua dove, Oena capensis
Asian emerald dove, Chalcophaps indica
Pacific emerald dove, Chalcophaps longirostris
Stephan's dove, Chalcophaps stephani
New Guinea bronzewing, Henicophaps albifrons
New Britain bronzewing, Henicophaps foersteri
Wetar ground dove, Alopecoenas hoedtii
Bronze ground dove, Alopecoenas beccarii
White-bibbed ground dove, Alopecoenas jobiensis
Shy ground dove, Alopecoenas sairi
Marquesas ground dove, Alopecoenas rubescens
Polynesian ground dove, Alopecoenas erypthropterus
Zebra dove, Geopelia striata
Peaceful dove, Geopelia placida
Barred dove, Geopelia maugeus
Bar-shouldered dove, Geopelia humeralis
Diamond dove, Geopelia cuneata
Nicobar pigeon, Caloenas nicobarica
Sulawesi ground dove, Gallicolumba tristigmata
Cinnamon ground dove, Gallicolumba rufigula
Mindoro bleeding-heart, Gallicolumba platenae
Negros bleeding-heart, Gallicolumba keayi
Sulu bleeding-heart, Gallicolumba menagei
Luzon bleeding-heart, Gallicolumba luzonica
Mindanao bleeding-heart, Gallicolumba crinigera
Thick-billed ground-pigeon, Trugon terrestris
Pheasant pigeon, Otidiphaps nobilis
Western crowned-pigeon, Goura cristata
Sclater's crowned-pigeon, Goura sclaterii
Scheepmaker's crowned-pigeon, Goura scheepmakeri
Victoria crowned-pigeon, Goura victoria
White-eared brown-dove, Phapitreron leucotis
Amethyst brown-dove, Phapitreron amethystinus
Mindanao brown-dove, Phapitreron brunniceps
Tawitawi brown-dove, Phapitreron cinereiceps
Little green-pigeon, Treron olax
Pink-necked green-pigeon, Treron vernans
Cinnamon-headed green-pigeon, Treron fulvicollis
Orange-breasted green-pigeon, Treron bicinctus
Sri Lanka green-pigeon, Treron pompadora
Gray-fronted green-pigeon, Treron affinis
Andaman green-pigeon, Treron chloropterus
Ashy-headed green-pigeon, Treron phayrei
Philippine green-pigeon, Treron axillaris
Buru green-pigeon, Treron aromaticus
Thick-billed green-pigeon, Treron curvirostra
Gray-cheeked green-pigeon, Treron griseicauda
Sumba green-pigeon, Treron teysmannii
Flores green-pigeon, Treron floris
Timor green-pigeon, Treron psittaceus
Large green-pigeon, Treron capellei
Yellow-footed green-pigeon, Treron phoenicopterus
Bruce's green-pigeon, Treron waalia
Yellow-vented green-pigeon, Treron seimundi
Pin-tailed green-pigeon, Treron apicauda
Green-spectacled green-pigeon, Treron oxyurus
Wedge-tailed green-pigeon, Treron sphenurus
White-bellied green-pigeon, Treron sieboldii
Whistling green-pigeon, Treron formosae
Black-backed fruit-dove, Ptilinopus cinctus
Red-naped fruit-dove, Ptilinopus dohertyi
Pink-headed fruit-dove, Ptilinopus porphyreus
Yellow-breasted fruit-dove, Ptilinopus occipitalis
Flame-breasted fruit-dove, Ptilinopus marchei
Cream-breasted fruit-dove, Ptilinopus merrilli
Red-eared fruit-dove, Ptilinopus fischeri
Jambu fruit-dove, Ptilinopus jambu
Maroon-chinned fruit-dove, Ptilinopus epius
Banggai fruit-dove, Ptilinopus subgularis
Sula fruit-dove, Ptilinopus mangoliensis
Black-chinned fruit-dove, Ptilinopus leclancheri
Scarlet-breasted fruit-dove, Ptilinopus bernsteinii
Wompoo fruit-dove, Ptilinopus magnificus
Pink-spotted fruit-dove, Ptilinopus perlatus
Ornate fruit-dove, Ptilinopus ornatus
Orange-fronted fruit-dove, Ptilinopus aurantiifrons
Wallace's fruit-dove, Ptilunopus wallacii
Superb fruit-dove, Ptilinopus superbus
Rose-crowned fruit-dove, Ptilinopus regina
Coroneted fruit-dove, Ptilinopus coronulatus
Beautiful fruit-dove, Ptilinopus pulchellus
Blue-capped fruit-dove, Ptilinopus monacha
White-breasted fruit-dove, Ptilinopus rivoli
Yellow-bibbed fruit-dove, Ptilinopus solomonensis
Geelvink fruit-dove, Ptilinopus speciosus
Claret-breasted fruit-dove, Ptilinopus viridis
Orange-bellied fruit-dove, Ptilinopus iozonus
Gray-headed fruit-dove, Ptilinopus hyogastrus
Carunculated fruit-dove, Ptilinopus granulifrons
Black-naped fruit-dove, Ptilinopus melanospilus
Dwarf fruit-dove, Ptilinopus nainus
Negros fruit-dove, Ptilinopus arcanus
Knob-billed fruit-dove, Ptilinopus insolitus
Black-banded fruit-dove, Ptilinopus alligator
Many-colored fruit-dove, Ptilinopus perousii
Crimson-crowned fruit-dove, Ptilinopus porphyraceus
Orange dove, Ptilinopus victor
Golden dove, Ptilinopus luteovirens
Velvet dove, Ptilinopus layardi
Pink-bellied imperial-pigeon, Ducula poliocephala
White-bellied imperial-pigeon, Ducula forsteni
Mindoro imperial-pigeon, Ducula mindorensis
Gray-headed imperial-pigeon, Ducula radiata
Spotted imperial-pigeon, Ducula carola
Green imperial-pigeon, Ducula aenea
Enggano imperial-pigeon, Ducula oenothorax
Nicobar imperial-pigeon, Ducula nicobarica
Spectacled imperial-pigeon, Ducula perspicillata
Seram imperial-pigeon, Ducula neglecta
Elegant imperial-pigeon, Ducula concinna
Pacific imperial-pigeon, Ducula pacifica
Spice imperial-pigeon, Ducula myristicivora
Geelvink imperial-pigeon, Ducula geelvinkiana
Purple-tailed imperial-pigeon, Ducula rufigaster
Cinnamon-bellied imperial-pigeon, Ducula basilica
Rufescent imperial-pigeon, Ducula chalconota
Island imperial-pigeon, Ducula pistrinaria
Pink-headed imperial-pigeon, Ducula rosacea
Gray imperial-pigeon, Ducula pickeringii
Pinon's imperial-pigeon, Ducula pinon
Collared imperial-pigeon, Ducula mullerii
Zoe's imperial-pigeon, Ducula zoeae
Mountain imperial-pigeon, Ducula badia
Malabar imperial-pigeon, Ducula cuprea
Dark-backed imperial-pigeon, Ducula lacernulata
Timor imperial-pigeon, Ducula cineracea
Pied imperial-pigeon, Ducula bicolor
Torresian imperial-pigeon, Ducula spilorrhoa
Silver-tipped imperial-pigeon, Ducula luctuosa
Red-knobbed imperial-pigeon, Docula rubricera
Finsch's imperial-pigeon, Docula finschii
Bismarck imperial-pigeon, Docula melanochroa
Yellowish imperial-pigeon, Docula subflavescens
Christmas Island imperial-pigeon, Docula whartoni
Peale's imperial-pigeon, Ducula latrans
Sombre pigeon, Cryptophaps poecilorrhoa
Papuan mountain-pigeon, Gymnophaps albertisii
Buru mountain-pigeon, Gymnophaps mada
Seram mountain-pigeon, Gymnophaps stalkeri
Pale mountain-pigeon, Gymnophaps solomonensis
Topknot pigeon, Lopholaimus antarcticus 
Common bronzewing, Phaps chalcoptera
Brush bronzewing, Phaps elegans
Flock bronzewing, Phaps histrionica
Crested pigeon, Ocyphaps lophotes
Spinifex pigeon, Geophaps plumifera
Squatter pigeon, Geophaps scripta
Partridge pigeon, Geophaps smithii
Chestnut-quilled rock-pigeon, Petrophassa rufipennis
White-quilled rock-pigeon, Petrophassa albipennis
Wonga pigeon, Leucosarcia melanoleuca
New Zealand pigeon, Hemiphaga novaeseelandiae
Black-billed Wood-dove, Turtur abyssinicus
Tambourine dove, Turtur tympanistria
Zenaida dove, Zenaida aurita
Mourning dove, Zenaida macroura
Eared dove, Zenaida auriculata
Common ground dove, Columbina passerina

Sandgrouse
Order: PterocliformesFamily: Pteroclidae

Sandgrouse have small, pigeon like heads and necks, but sturdy compact bodies. They have long pointed wings and sometimes tails and a fast direct flight. Flocks fly to watering holes at dawn and dusk. Their legs are feathered down to the toes.

Tibetan sandgrouse, Syrrhaptes tibetanus
Pallas's sandgrouse, Syrrhaptes paradoxus
Pin-tailed sandgrouse, Pterocles alchata
Chestnut-bellied sandgrouse, Pterocles exustus
Spotted sandgrouse, Pterocles senegallus
Black-bellied sandgrouse, Pterocles orientalis
Crowned sandgrouse, Pterocles coronatus
Lichtenstein's sandgrouse, Pterocles lichtensteinii
Painted sandgrouse, Pterocles indicus
Four-banded sandgrouse, Pterocles quadricinctus

Bustards
Order: OtidiformesFamily: Otididae

Bustards are large terrestrial birds mainly associated with dry open country and steppes in the Old World. They are omnivorous and nest on the ground. They walk steadily on strong legs and big toes, pecking for food as they go. They have long broad wings with "fingered" wingtips and striking patterns in flight. Many have interesting mating displays.

Great bustard, Otis tarda
Arabian bustard, Ardeotis arabs
Great Indian bustard, Ardeotis nigriceps
Australian bustard, Ardeotis australis
Macqueen's bustard, Chlamydotis macqueenii
Houbara bustard, Chalmydotis undulata
Bengal florican, Houbaropsis bengalensis
Lesser florican, Sypheotides indicus
Little bustard, Tetrax tetrax

Cuckoos
Order: CuculiformesFamily: Cuculidae

The family Cuculidae includes cuckoos, roadrunners and anis. These birds are of variable size with slender bodies, long tails and strong legs.

Sumatran ground-cuckoo, Carpococcyx viridis
Bornean ground-cuckoo, Carpococcyx radiatus
Coral-billed ground-cuckoo, Carpococcyx renauldi
Biak coucal, Centropus chalybeus
Greater black coucal, Centropus menbeki
Rufous coucal, Centropus unirufus
Green-billed coucal, Centropus chlororhynchus
Black-faced coucal, Centropus melanops
Short-toed coucal, Centropus rectunguis
Black-hooded coucal, Centropus steerii
Bay coucal, Centropus celebensis
White-browed coucal, Centropus superciliosus
Sunda coucal, Centropus nigrorufus
Andaman coucal, Centropus andamanensis
Greater coucal, Centropus sinensis
Goliath coucal, Centropus goliath
Philippine coucal, Centropus viridis
Lesser coucal, Centropus bengalensis
Lesser black coucal, Centropus bernsteini
Pheasant coucal, Centropus phasianinus
Pied coucal, Centropus ateralbus
Violaceous coucal, Centropus violaceus
Senegal coucal, Centropus senegalensis
Raffles's malkoha, Rhinortha chlorophaea
Sirkeer malkoha, Taccocua leschenaultii
Red-billed malkoha, Zanclostomus javanicus
Chestnut-breasted malkoha, Phaenicophaeus curvirostris
Chestnut-bellied malkoha, Phaenicophaeus sumatranus
Red-faced malkoha, Phaenicophaeus pyrrhocephalus
Blue-faced malkoha, Phaenicophaeus viridirostris
Black-bellied malkoha, Phaenicophaeus diardi
Green-billed malkoha, Phaenicophaeus tristis
Yellow-billed malkoha, Rhamphococcyx calyorhynchus
Red-crested malkoha, Dasylophus superciliosus
Scale-feathered malkoha, Dasylophus cumingi
Chestnut-winged cuckoo, Clamator coromandus
Great spotted cuckoo, Clamator glandarius
Pied cuckoo, Clamator jacobinus
Dwarf koel, Microdynamis parva
Asian koel, Eudynamys scolopaceus
Black-billed koel, Eudynamys melanorhynchus
Pacific koel, Eudynamys orientalis
Long-tailed koel, Urodynamis taitensis
Channel-billed cuckoo, Scythrops novaehollandiae
Asian emerald cuckoo, Chrysococcyx maculatus
Violet cuckoo, Chrysococcyx xanthorhynchus
Dideric cuckoo, Chrysococcyx caprius
Klaas's cuckoo, Chrysococcyx klaas
Long-billed cuckoo, Chrysococcyx megarhynchus
Horsfield's bronze-cuckoo, Chrysococcyx basalis
Black-eared cuckoo, Chrysococcyx osculans
Rufous-throated bronze-cuckoo, Chrysococcyx ruficollis
Shining bronze-cuckoo, Chrysococcyx lucidus
White-eared bronze-cuckoo, Chrysococcyx meyerii
Little bronze-cuckoo, Chrysococcyx minutillus
Pallid cuckoo, Cacomantis pallidus
White-crowned koel, Cacomantis leucolophus
Chestnut-breasted cuckoo, Cacomantis castaneiventris
Fan-tailed cuckoo, Cacomantis flabelliformis
Banded bay cuckoo, Cacomantis sonneratii
Plaintive cuckoo, Cacomantis merulinus
Gray-bellied cuckoo, Cacomantis passerinus
Moluccan cuckoo, Cacomantis aeruginosus
Brush cuckoo, Cacomantis variolosus
Fork-tailed drongo-cuckoo, Surniculus dicruroides
Philippine drongo-cuckoo, Surniculus velutinus
Square-tailed drongo-cuckoo, Surniculus lugubris
Moluccan drongo-cuckoo, Surniculus musschenbroeki
Moustached hawk-cuckoo, Hierococcyx vagans
Large hawk cuckoo, Hierococcyx sparverioides
Dark hawk-cuckoo, Hierococcyx bocki
Common hawk-cuckoo, Hierococcyx varius
Northern hawk-cuckoo, Hierococcyx hyperythrus
Philippine hawk-cuckoo, Hierococcyx pectoralis
Hodgson's hawk-cuckoo, Hierococcyx nisicolor
Malaysian hawk-cuckoo, Hierococcyx fugax
Lesser cuckoo, Cuculus poliocephalus
Sulawesi cuckoo, Cuculus crassirostris
Indian cuckoo, Cuculus micropterus
Himalayan cuckoo, Cuculus saturatus
Sunda cuckoo, Cuculus lepidus
Common cuckoo, Cuculus canorus
Oriental cuckoo, Cuculus optatus

Frogmouths
Order: CaprimulgiformesFamily: Podargidae

The frogmouths are a group of nocturnal birds related to the nightjars. They are named for their large flattened hooked bill and huge frog-like gape, which they use to take insects.

Marbled frogmouth, Podargus ocellatus
Papuan frogmouth, Podargus papuensis
Tawny frogmouth, Podargus strigoides
Large frogmouth, Batrachostomus auritus
Dulit frogmouth, Batrachostomus harterti
Philippine frogmouth, Batrachostomus septimus
Gould's frogmouth, Batrachostomus stellatus
Sri Lanka frogmouth, Batrachostomus moniliger
Hodgson's frogmouth, Batrachostomus hodgsoni
Sumatran frogmouth, Batrachostomus poliolophus
Bornean frogmouth, Batrachostomus mixtus
Javan frogmouth, Batrachostomus javensis
Blyth's frogmouth, Batrachostomus affinis
Palawan frogmouth, Batrachostomus chaseni
Sunda frogmouth, Batrachostomus cornutus
Solomons frogmouth, Rigidipenna inexpectata

Nightjars and allies
Order: CaprimulgiformesFamily: Caprimulgidae

Nightjars are medium-sized nocturnal birds that usually nest on the ground. They have long wings, short legs and very short bills. Most have small feet, of little use for walking, and long pointed wings. Their soft plumage is camouflaged to resemble bark or leaves.

Spotted nightjar, Eurostopodus argus
Solomons nightjar, Eurostopodus nigripennis
White-throated nightjar, Eurostopodus mystacalis
Diabolical nightjar, Eurostopodus diabolicus
Papuan nightjar, Eurostopodus papuensis
Archbold's nightjar, Eurostopodus archboldi
Malaysian eared-nightjar, Lyncornis temminckii
Great eared-nightjar, Lyncornis macrotis
Jungle nightjar, Caprimulgus indicus
Gray nightjar, Caprimulgus jotaka
Eurasian nightjar, Caprimulgus europaeus
Egyptian nightjar, Caprimulgus aegyptius
Nubian nightjar, Caprimulgus nubicus
Sykes's nightjar, Caprimulgus mahrattensis
Vaurie's nightjar, Caprimulgus centralasicus
Large-tailed nightjar, Caprimulgus macrurus
Andaman nightjar, Caprimulgus andamanicus
Mees's nightjar, Caprimulgus meesi
Jerdon's nightjar, Caprimulgus atripennis
Philippine nightjar, Caprimulgus manillensis
Sulawesi nightjar, Caprimulgus celebensis
Indian nightjar, Caprimulgus asiaticus
Plain nightjar, Caprimulgus inornatus
Savanna nightjar, Caprimulgus affinis
Bonaparte's nightjar, Caprimulgus concretus
Salvadori's nightjar, Caprimulgus pulchellus
Red-necked nightjar, Caprimulgus ruficollis
Montane nightjar, Caprimulgus poliocephalus
Golden nightjar, Caprimulgus eximius

Owlet-nightjars
Order: CaprimulgiformesFamily: Aegothelidae

The owlet-nightjars are small nocturnal birds related to the nightjars and frogmouths. They are insectivores which hunt mostly in the air. Their soft plumage is a mixture of browns and paler shades.

Feline owlet-nightjar, Aegotheles insignis
Starry owlet-nightjar, Aegotheles tatei (A)
Wallace's owlet-nightjar, Aegotheles wallacii
Mountain owlet-nightjar, Aegotheles albertisi
Moluccan owlet-nightjar, Aegotheles cirnifrons
Vogelkop owlet-nightjar, Aegotheles affinis
Barred owlet-nightjar, Aegotheles bennettii
Australian owlet-nightjar, Aegotheles cristatus

Swifts
Order: CaprimulgiformesFamily: Apodidae

Swifts are small birds which spend the majority of their lives flying. These birds have very short legs and never settle voluntarily on the ground, perching instead only on vertical surfaces. Many swifts have long swept-back wings which resemble a crescent or boomerang.

Philippine spinetailed swift, Mearnsia picina
Papuan spinetailed swift, Mearnsia novaeguineae
White-rumped needletail, Zoonavena sylvatica
Silver-rumped needletail, Rhaphidura leucopygialis
Sabine's spinetail, Rhaphidura sabini
White-throated needletail, Hirundapus caudacutus
Silver-backed needletail, Hirundapus cochinchinensis
Brown-backed needletail, Hirundapus giganteus
Purple needletail, Hirundapus celebensis
Waterfall swift, Hydrochous gigas
Pygmy swiftlet, Collocalia troglodytes
Bornean swiftlet, Collocalia dodgei
Cave swiftlet, Collocalia linchi
Plume-toed swiftlet, Collocalia affinis
Gray-rumped swiftlet, Collocalia marginata
Ridgetop swiftlet, Collocalia isonota
Tenggara swiftlet, Collocalia sumbawae
Drab swiftlet, Collocalia neglecta
Glossy swiftlet, Collocalia esculenta
Satin swiftlet, Collocalia uropygialis
Christmas Island swiftlet, Collocalia natalis
Indian swiftlet, Aerodramus unicolor
Sulawesi swiftlet, Aerodramus sororum
Halmahera swiftlet, Aerodramus infuscatus
Seram swiftlet, Aerodramus cermaensis
Philippine swiftlet, Aerodramus mearnsi
Mountain swiftlet, Aerodramus hirundinaceus
Himalayan swiftlet, Aerodramus brevirostris
Volcano swiftlet, Aerodramus vulcanorum
Whitehead's swiftlet, Aerodramus whiteheadi
Bare-legged swiftlet, Aerodramus nuditarsus
Ameline swiftlet, Aerodramus amelis
Palawan swiftlet, Aerodramus palawanensis
Uniform swiftlet, Aerodramus vanikorensis
Mossy-nest swiftlet, Aerodramus salangana
Black-nest swiftlet, Aerodramus maximus
White-nest swiftlet, Aerodramus fuciphagus
German's swiftlet, Aerodramus germani
Three-toed swiftlet, Aerodramus papuensis
White-rumped swiftlet, Aerodramus spodiopygius
Australian swiftlet, Aerodramus terraereginae
Mayr's swiftlet, Aerodramus orientalis 
Alpine swift, Apus melba
Common swift, Apus apus
Pallid swift, Apus pallidus
Pacific swift, Apus pacificus
Salim Ali's swift, Apus salimalii
Blyth's swift, Apus leuconyx
Cook's swift, Apus cooki
Dark-rumped swift, Apus acuticauda
Little swift, Apus affinis
House swift, Apus nipalensis
White-rumped swift, Apus caffer
Plain swift, Apus unicolor
Forbes-Watson's swift, Apus berliozi 
Asian palm-swift, Cypsiurus balasiensis
African palm-swift, Cypsiurus parvus

Treeswifts
Order: CaprimulgiformesFamily: Hemiprocnidae

The treeswifts, also called crested swifts, are closely related to the true swifts. They differ from the other swifts in that they have crests, long forked tails and softer plumage.

Crested treeswift, Hemiprocne coronata
Gray-rumped treeswift, Hemiprocne longipennis
Whiskered treeswift, Hemiprocne comata
Moustached treeswift, Hemiprocne mystacea

Rails, gallinules, and coots
Order: GruiformesFamily: Rallidae

Rallidae is a large family of small to medium-sized birds which includes the rails, crakes, coots and gallinules. Typically they inhabit dense vegetation in damp environments near lakes, swamps or rivers. In general they are shy and secretive birds, making them difficult to observe. Most species have strong legs and long toes which are well adapted to soft uneven surfaces. They tend to have short, rounded wings and to be weak fliers.

Water rail, Rallus aquaticus
Brown-cheeked rail, Rallus indicus
Corn crake, Crex crex
Snoring rail, Aramidopsis plateni
Slaty-breasted rail, Lewinia striata
Luzon rail, Lewinia mirifica
Lewin's rail, Lewinia pectoralis
Blue-faced rail, Gymnocrex rosenbergii
Bare-eyed rail, Gymnocrex plumbeiventris
Talaud rail, Gymnocrex talaudensis
Calayan rail, Gallirallus calayanensis
Invisible rail, Gallirallus wallacii
Chestnut rail, Gallirallus castaneoventris
Okinawa rail, Gallirallus okinawae
Buff-banded rail, Gallirallus philippensis
Barred rail, Gallirallus torquatus
New Britain rail, Gallirallus insignis
Woodford's rail, Gallirallus woodfordi
Weka, Galliarallus australis
Lord Howe woodhen, Galliarallus sylvestris
Bar-winged rail, Galliarallus poecilopterus
Sora, Porzana carolina
Spotted crake, Porzana porzana
Eurasian moorhen, Gallinula chloropus
Dusky moorhen, Gallinula tenebrosa
Eurasian coot, Fulica atra
Red-knobbed coot, Fulica cristata
American coot, Fulica americana
Allen's gallinule, Porphyrio alleni
Black-backed swamphen, Porphyrio indicus
Australasian swamphen, Porphyrio melanotus
Philippine swamphen, Porphyrio pulverulentus
Gray-headed swamphen, Porphyrio poliocephalus
African swamphen, Porphyrio madagascariensis
Purple gallinule, Porphyrio martinica 
New Guinea flightless rail, Megacrex inepta
Watercock, Gallicrex cinerea
Isabelline bush-hen, Amaurornis isabellina
Plain bush-hen, Amaurornis olivacea (E)
White-breasted waterhen, Amaurornis phoenicurus
Talaud bush-hen, Amaurornis magnirostris
Pale-vented bush-hen, Amaurornis moluccana
Striped crake, Amaurornis marginalis
White-browed crake, Poliolimnas cinereus
Chestnut forest-rail, Rallina rubra
White-striped forest-rail, Rallina leucospila
Forbes's rail, Rallina forbesi
Mayr's rail, Rallina mayri
Red-necked crake, Rallina tricolor
Andaman crake, Rallina canningi
Red-legged crake, Rallina fasciata
Slaty-legged crake, Rallina eurizonoides
Ruddy-breasted crake, Zapornia fusca
Band-bellied crake, Zapornia paykullii
Brown crake, Zapornia akool
Little crake, Zapornia parva
Baillon's crake, Zapornia pusilla
Black-tailed crake, Zapornia bicolor
Spotless crake, Zapornia tabuensis
Swinhoe's rail, Zapornia exquisitus
Black crake, Zaporina flavirostra
Black-tailed nativehen, Tribonyx ventralis
Tasmanian nativehen, Tribonyx mortierii
Lesser moorhen, Paragallinula angulata
Swinhoe's rail, Coturnicops exquisitus 
Striped crake, Aenigmatolimnas marginalis
Giant wood-rail, Aramides ypecaha

Finfoots
Order: GruiformesFamily: Heliornithidae

Heliornithidae is small family of tropical birds with webbed lobes on their feet similar to those of grebes and coots.

Masked finfoot, Heliopais personatus

Cranes
Order: GruiformesFamily: Gruidae

Cranes are large, long-legged, and long-necked birds. Unlike the similar-looking but unrelated herons, cranes fly with necks outstretched, not pulled back. Most have elaborate and noisy courting displays or "dances".

Demoiselle crane, Anthropoides virgo
Siberian crane, Leucogeranus leucogeranus
Sandhill crane, Antigone canadensis
Sarus crane, Antigone antigone
Brolga, Antigone rubicunda
White-naped crane, Antigone vipio
Common crane, Grus grus
Hooded crane, Grus monacha
Black-necked crane, Grus nigricollis
Red-crowned crane, Grus japonensis
Black crowned-crane, Balearica pavonina

Sheathbills
Black-faced sheathbill, Chionis minor
Snowy sheathbill, Chionis albus

Thick-knees
Order: CharadriiformesFamily: Burhinidae

The thick-knees are found worldwide within the tropical zone, with some species also breeding in temperate Europe and Australia. They are medium to large waders with strong black or yellow-black bills, large yellow eyes, and cryptic plumage. Despite being classed as waders, most species have a preference for arid or semi-arid habitats.

Eurasian thick-knee, Burhinus oedicnemus
Indian thick-knee, Burhinus indicus
Spotted thick-knee, Burhinus capensis
Bush thick-knee, Burhinus grallarius
Senegal thick-knee, Burhinus senegalensis
Peruvian thick-knee, Burhinus superciliaris
Great thick-knee, Esacus recurvirostris
Beach thick-knee, Esacus magnirostris

Egyptian plover
Order: CharadriiformesFamily: Pluvianidae

The Egyptian plover is found across equatorial Africa and along the Nile River.

Egyptian plover, Pluvianus aegyptius

Stilts and avocets
Order: CharadriiformesFamily: Recurvirostridae

Recurvirostridae is a family of large wading birds, which includes the avocets and stilts. The avocets have long legs and long up-curved bills. The stilts have extremely long legs and long, thin, straight bills.

Black-winged stilt, Himantopus himantopus
Pied stilt, Himantopus leucocephalus
Black-necked stilt, Himantopus mexicanus
Pied avocet, Recurvirostra avosetta
Red-necked avocet, Recurvirostra novaehollandiae (A)
American avocet, Recurvirostra americana
Banded stilt, Cladorhynchus leucocephalus

Ibisbill
Order: CharadriiformesFamily: Ibidorhynchidae

The ibisbill is related to the waders, but is sufficiently distinctive to be a family unto itself. The adult is gray with a white belly, red legs, a long down curved bill, and a black face and breast band.

Ibisbill, Ibidorhyncha struthersii

Oystercatchers
Order: CharadriiformesFamily: Haematopodidae

The oystercatchers are large and noisy plover-like birds, with strong bills used for smashing or prising open molluscs.

Eurasian oystercatcher, Haematopus ostralegus
Pied oystercatcher, Haematopus longirostris
Sooty oystercatcher, Haematopus fuliginosus (A)
Black oystercatcher, Haematopus bachmani
South Island oystercatcher, Haematopus finschi
Canarian oystercatcher, Haematopus meadewaldoi

Plovers and lapwings
Order: CharadriiformesFamily: Charadriidae

The family Charadriidae includes the plovers, dotterels and lapwings. They are small to medium-sized birds with compact bodies, short, thick necks and long, usually pointed, wings. They are found in open country worldwide, mostly in habitats near water.

Black-bellied plover, Pluvialis squatarola
European golden-plover, Pluvialis apricaria
American golden-plover, Pluvialis dominica
Pacific golden-plover, Pluvialis fulva
Northern lapwing, Vanellus vanellus
Blacksmith lapwing, Vanellus armatus (A)
Spur-winged plover, Vanellus spinosus
River lapwing, Vanellus duvaucelii
Yellow-wattled lapwing, Vanellus malabaricus
Black-headed lapwing, Vanellus tectus
Gray-headed lapwing, Vanellus cinereus
Red-wattled lapwing, Vanellus indicus
Javan lapwing, Vanellus macropterus
Masked lapwing, Vanellus miles
Sociable lapwing, Vanellus gregarius
White-tailed lapwing, Vanellus leucurus
Banded lapwing, Vanellus tricolor
Black-winged lapwing, Vanellus melanopterus
Crowned lapwing, Vanellus coronatus
Southern lapwing, Vanellus chilensis
Lesser sand-plover, Charadrius mongolus
Greater sand-plover, Charadrius leschenaultii
Caspian plover, Charadrius asiaticus
Kittlitz's plover, Charadrius pecuarius
Red-capped plover, Charadrius ruficapillus
Malaysian plover, Charadrius peronii
Kentish plover, Charadrius alexandrinus
White-faced plover, Charadrius dealbatus
Snowy plover, Charadrius nivosus
Javan plover, Charadrius javanicus
Common ringed plover, Charadrius hiaticula
Semipalmated plover, Charadrius semipalmatus
Long-billed plover, Charadrius placidus
Little ringed plover, Charadrius dubius
Killdeer, Charadrius vociferus (A)
Oriental plover, Charadrius veredus
Eurasian dotterel, Charadrius morinellus
Three-banded plover, Charadrius tricollaris
Double-banded plover, Charadrius bicinctus
White-fronted plover, Charadrius marginatus
Red-kneed dotterel, Elseyornis cinctus
Black-fronted dotterel, Elseyornis melanops
Hooded plover, Thinornis cucullatus
Inland dotterel, Peltohyas australis

Plains-Wanderer
Plains-wanderer, Pedionomus torquatus

Painted-snipes
Order: CharadriiformesFamily: Rostratulidae

Painted-snipes are short-legged, long-billed birds similar in shape to the true snipes, but more brightly colored.

Greater painted-snipe, Rostratula benghalensis

Jacanas
Order: CharadriiformesFamily: Jacanidae

The jacanas are a group of tropical waders in the family Jacanidae. They are found throughout the tropics. They are identifiable by their huge feet and claws which enable them to walk on floating vegetation in the shallow lakes that are their preferred habitat.

Comb-crested jacana, Irediparra gallinacea
Pheasant-tailed jacana, Hydrophasianus chirurgus
Bronze-winged jacana, Metopidius indicus

Sandpipers and allies
Order: CharadriiformesFamily: Scolopacidae

Scolopacidae is a large diverse family of small to medium-sized shorebirds including the sandpipers, curlews, godwits, shanks, tattlers, woodcocks, snipes, dowitchers and phalaropes. The majority of these species eat small invertebrates picked out of the mud or soil. Variation in length of legs and bills enables multiple species to feed in the same habitat, particularly on the coast, without direct competition for food.

Upland sandpiper, Bartramia longicauda (A)
Bristle-thighed curlew, Numenius tahitiensis
Whimbrel, Numenius phaeopus
Little curlew, Numenius minutus
Eskimo curlew, Numenius borealis
Far Eastern curlew, Numenius madagascariensis
Slender-billed curlew, Numenius tenuirostris
Eurasian curlew, Numenius arquata
Bar-tailed godwit, Limosa lapponica
Black-tailed godwit, Limosa limosa
Hudsonian godwit, Limosa haemastica
Ruddy turnstone, Arenaria interpres
Black turnstone, Arenaria melanocephala
Great knot, Calidris tenuirostris
Red knot, Calidris canutus
Ruff, Calidris pugnax
Broad-billed sandpiper, Calidris falcinellus
Sharp-tailed sandpiper, Calidris acuminata
Stilt sandpiper, Calidris himantopus (A)
Curlew sandpiper, Calidris ferruginea
Temminck's stint, Calidris temminckii
Long-toed stint, Calidris subminuta
Spoon-billed sandpiper, Calidris pygmeus
Red-necked stint, Calidris ruficollis
Sanderling, Calidris alba
Dunlin, Calidris alpina
Rock sandpiper, Calidris ptilocnemis
Purple sandpiper, Calidris maritima
Baird's sandpiper, Calidris bairdii
Little stint, Calidris minuta
Least sandpiper, Calidris minutilla
White-rumped sandpiper, Calidris fuscicollis (A)
Buff-breasted sandpiper, Calidris subruficollis
Pectoral sandpiper, Calidris melanotos
Semipalmated sandpiper, Calidris pusilla
Western sandpiper, Calidris mauri
Asian dowitcher, Limnodromus semipalmatus (A)
Short-billed dowitcher, Limnodromus griseus
Long-billed dowitcher, Limnodromus scolopaceus
Jack snipe, Lymnocryptes minimus
Eurasian woodcock, Scolopax rusticola
Amami woodcock, Scolopax mira
Bukidnon woodcock, Scolopax bukidnonensis
Javan woodcock, Scolopax saturata
New Guinea woodcock, Scolopax rosenbergii
Sulawesi woodcock, Scolopax celebensis
Moluccan woodcock, Scolopax rochussenii
American woodcock, Scolopax minor
Solitary snipe, Gallinago solitaria
Latham's snipe, Gallinago hardwickii
Wood snipe, Gallinago nemoricola
Great snipe, Gallinago media
Common snipe, Gallinago gallinago
Wilson's snipe, Gallinago delicata
Pin-tailed snipe, Gallinago stenura
Swinhoe's snipe, Gallinago megala
Terek sandpiper, Xenus cinereus
Wilson's phalarope, Phalaropus tricolor
Red-necked phalarope, Phalaropus lobatus
Red phalarope, Phalaropus fulicarius
Common sandpiper, Actitis hypoleucos
Spotted sandpiper, Actitis macularius
Green sandpiper, Tringa ochropus
Solitary sandpiper, Tringa solitaria (A)
Gray-tailed tattler, Tringa brevipes
Wandering tattler, Tringa incana
Spotted redshank, Tringa erythropus
Greater yellowlegs, Tringa melanoleuca
Common greenshank, Tringa nebularia
Nordmann's greenshank, Tringa guttifer
Lesser yellowlegs, Tringa flavipes
Marsh sandpiper, Tringa stagnatilis
Wood sandpiper, Tringa glareola
Common redshank, Tringa totanus
Willet, Tringa semipalmata

Buttonquail
Order: CharadriiformesFamily: Turnicidae

The buttonquail are small, drab, running birds which resemble the true quails. The female is the brighter of the sexes and initiates courtship. The male incubates the eggs and tends the young.

Small buttonquail, Turnix sylvaticus
Red-backed buttonquail, Turnix maculosus
Yellow-legged buttonquail, Turnix tanki
Spotted buttonquail, Turnix ocellatus
Barred buttonquail, Turnix suscitator
Luzon buttonquail, Turnix worcesteri
Sumba buttonquail, Turnix everetti
Red-chested buttonquail, Turnix pyrrhothorax
Black-breasted buttonquail, Turnix melanogaster
Chestnut-backed buttonquail, Turnix castanotus
Buff-breasted buttonquail, Turnix olivii
Painted buttonquail, Turnix varius 
Little buttonquail, Turnix velox

Crab plover
Order: CharadriiformesFamily: Dromadidae

The crab-plover is related to the waders. It resembles a plover but with very long grey legs and a strong heavy black bill similar to a tern. It has black-and-white plumage, a long neck, partially webbed feet and a bill designed for eating crabs.

Crab-plover, Dromas ardeola

Pratincoles and coursers
Order: CharadriiformesFamily: Glareolidae

Glareolidae is a family of wading birds comprising the pratincoles, which have short legs, long pointed wings and long forked tails, and the coursers, which have long legs, short wings and long, pointed bills which curve downwards.

Cream-colored courser, Cursorius cursor
Indian courser, Cursorius coromandelicus
Temminck's courser, Cursorius temminckii
Jerdon's courser, Rhinoptilus bitorquatus
Australian pratincole, Stiltia isabella
Collared pratincole, Glareola pratincola
Oriental pratincole, Glareola maldivarum
Black-winged pratincole, Glareola nordmanni
Small pratincole, Glareola lactea
Bronze-winged courser, Rhinoptilus chalcopterus

Skuas and jaegers
Order: CharadriiformesFamily: Stercorariidae

The family Stercorariidae are, in general, medium to large birds, typically with gray or brown plumage, often with white markings on the wings. They nest on the ground in temperate and arctic regions and are long-distance migrants.

Great skua, Stercorarius skua
South polar skua, Stercorarius maccormicki
Brown skua, Stercorarius antarcticus
Pomarine jaeger, Stercorarius pomarinus 
Parasitic jaeger, Stercorarius parasiticus 
Long-tailed jaeger, Stercorarius longicaudus

Auks, murres and puffins
Order: CharadriiformesFamily: Alcidae

Alcids are superficially similar to penguins due to their black-and-white colors, their upright posture and some of their habits, however they are not related to the penguins and differ in being able to fly. Auks live on the open sea, only deliberately coming ashore to nest.

Dovekie, Alle alle
Common murre, Uria aalge
Thick-billed murre, Uria lomvia
Razorbill, Alca torda
Great auk, Pinguinus impennis (X)
Black guillemot, Cepphus grylle
Pigeon guillemot, Cepphus columba
Spectacled guillemot, Cepphus carbo
Long-billed murrelet, Brachyramphus perdix
Kittlitz's murrelet, Brachyramphus brevirostris
Ancient murrelet, Synthliboramphus antiquus
Japanese murrelet, Synthliboramphus wumizusume
Guadalupe murrelet, Synthliborhamphus hypoleucus
Cassin's auklet, Ptychoramphus aleuticus
Parakeet auklet, Aethia psittacula
Least auklet, Aethia pusilla
Whiskered auklet, Aethia pygmaea
Crested auklet, Aethia cristatella
Rhinoceros auklet, Cerorhinca monocerata
Atlantic puffin, Fratercula arctica
Horned puffin, Fratercula corniculata
Tufted puffin, Fratercula cirrhata

Gulls, terns, and skimmers
Order: CharadriiformesFamily: Laridae

Laridae is a family of medium to large seabirds, the gulls, terns and skimmers. Gulls are typically gray or white, often with black markings on the head or wings. They have stout, longish bills and webbed feet. Terns are a group of generally medium to large seabirds typically with gray or white plumage, often with black markings on the head. Most terns hunt fish by diving but some pick insects off the surface of fresh water. Terns are generally long-lived birds, with several species known to live in excess of 30 years. Skimmers are a small family of tropical tern-like birds. They have an elongated lower mandible which they use to feed by flying low over the water surface and skimming the water for small fish.

Black-legged kittiwake, Rissa tridactyla
Red-legged kittiwake, Rissa brevirostris
Ivory gull, Pagophila eburnea
Sabine's gull, Xema sabini
Saunders's gull, Saundersilarus saundersi
Slender-billed gull, Chroicocephalus genei
Bonaparte's gull, Chroicocephalus philadelphia
Silver gull, Chroicocephalus novaehollandiae
Gray-hooded gull, Chroicocephalus cirrocephalus
Black-headed gull, Chroicocephalus ridibundus
Brown-headed gull, Chroicocephalus brunnicephalus
Little gull, Hydrocoloeus minutus
Ross's gull, Rhodostethia rosea
Laughing gull, Leucophaeus atricilla (A)
Franklin's gull, Leucophaeus pipixcan
Dolphin gull, Leucophaeus scoresbii
Mediterranean gull, Ichthyaetus melanocephalus
Relict gull, Ichthyaetus relictus
White-eyed gull, Ichthyaetus leucophthalmus
Sooty gull, Ichthyaetus hemprichii
Pallas's gull, Ichthyaetus ichthyaetus
Audouin's gull, Ichthyaetus audouinii
Black-tailed gull, Larus crassirostris
Common gull, Larus canus (A)
Short-billed gull, Larus brachyrhynchus (A)
Ring-billed gull, Larus delawarensis
Western gull, Larus occidentalis (A)
California gull, Larus californicus
Herring gull, Larus argentatus
Yellow-legged gull, Larus michahellis (A)
Caspian gull, Larus cachinnans
Armenian gull, Larus armenicus
Iceland gull, Larus glaucoides
Lesser black-backed gull, Larus fuscus
Slaty-backed gull, Larus schistisagus
Glaucous-winged gull, Larus glaucescens
Glaucous gull, Larus hyperboreus
Great black-backed gull, Larus marinus
Kelp gull, Larus dominicanus
Pacific gull, Larus pacificus
Brown noddy, Anous stolidus
Black noddy, Anous minutus
Lesser noddy, Anous tenuirostris
Grey noddy, Anous albivitta
Blue-gray noddy, Procelsterna ceruleus
White tern, Gygis alba
Sooty tern, Onychoprion fuscatus
Gray-backed tern, Onychoprion lunatus
Bridled tern, Onychoprion anaethetus
Aleutian tern, Onychoprion aleuticus
Little tern, Sternula albifrons
Least tern, Sternula antillarum
Saunders's tern, Sternula saundersi
Australian fairy tern, Sternula nereis
Gull-billed tern, Gelochelidon nilotica
Caspian tern, Hydroprogne caspia
Black tern, Chlidonias niger
White-winged tern, Chlidonias leucopterus
Whiskered tern, Chlidonias hybrida
Roseate tern, Sterna dougallii
Black-naped tern, Sterna sumatrana
Common tern, Sterna hirundo
Arctic tern, Sterna paradisaea
Black-bellied tern, Sterna acuticauda
River tern, Sterna aurantia
White-cheeked tern, Sterna repressa
White-fronted tern, Sterna striata
Antarctic tern, Sterna vittata
Forster's tern, Sterna forsteri
Great crested tern, Thalasseus bergii
Sandwich tern, Thalasseus sandvicensis
Lesser crested tern, Thalasseus bengalensis
Chinese crested tern, Thalasseus bernsteini
Royal tern, Thalasseus maximus
Elegant tern, Thalasseus elegans
African skimmer, Rynchops flavirostris
Indian skimmer, Rynchops albicollis
Black skimmer, Rynchops niger 
Swallow-tailed gull, Creagrus furcatus

Tropicbirds
Order: PhaethontiformesFamily: Phaethontidae

Tropicbirds are slender white birds of tropical oceans, with exceptionally long central tail feathers. Their heads and long wings have black markings.

White-tailed tropicbird, Phaethon lepturus
Red-billed tropicbird, Phaethon aethereus
Red-tailed tropicbird, Phaethon rubricauda

Loons
Order: GaviiformesFamily: Gaviidae

Loons, known as divers in Europe, are a group of aquatic birds found in many parts of North America and northern Europe. They are the size of a large duck or small goose, which they somewhat resemble when swimming, but to which they are completely unrelated.

Red-throated loon, Gavia stellata
Arctic loon, Gavia arctica
Pacific loon, Gavia pacifica
Common loon, Gavia immer
Yellow-billed loon, Gavia adamsii

Albatrosses
Order: ProcellariiformesFamily: Diomedeidae

The albatrosses are among the largest of flying birds, and the great albatrosses from the genus Diomedea have the largest wingspans of any extant birds.

Yellow-nosed albatross, Thalassarche chlororhynchos
White-capped albatross, Thalassarche cauta
Grey-headed albatross, Thalassarche chrysostoma
Buller's albatross, Thalassarche bulleri
Salvin's albatross, Thalassarche salvini
Chatham albatross, Thalassarche eremita
Campbell albatross, Thalassarche impavida
Black-browed albatross, Thalassarche melanophris
Wandering albatross, Diomedea exulans
Royal albatross, Diomedea epomophora
Laysan albatross, Phoebastria immutabilis
Black-footed albatross, Phoebastria nigripes
Short-tailed albatross, Phoebastria albatrus
Sooty albatross, Phoebetria fusca 
Light-mantled albatross, Phoebetria palpebrata

Southern storm-petrels
Order: ProcellariiformesFamily: Oceanitidae

The southern storm-petrels are relatives of the petrels and are the smallest seabirds. They feed on planktonic crustaceans and small fish picked from the surface, typically while hovering.

Wilson's storm-petrel, Oceanites oceanicus
White-faced storm-petrel, Pelagodroma marina
White-bellied storm-petrel, Fregetta grallaria
Black-bellied storm-petrel, Fregetta tropica
New Zealand storm-petrel, Fregetta maoriana
Grey-backed storm-petrel, Garrodia nereis
Polynesian storm-petrel, Nesofregetta fuliginosa

Northern storm-petrels
Order: ProcellariiformesFamily: Hydrobatidae

The northern storm-petrels are relatives of the petrels and are the smallest seabirds. They feed on planktonic crustaceans and small fish picked from the surface, typically while hovering. The flight is fluttering and sometimes bat-like.

European storm-petrel, Hydrobates pelagicus
Fork-tailed storm-petrel, Hydrobates furcatus
Leach's storm-petrel, Hydrobates leucorhous
Swinhoe's storm-petrel, Hydrobates monorhis
Band-rumped storm-petrel, Hydrobates castro
Matsudaira's storm-petrel, Hydrobates matsudairae
Tristram's storm-petrel, Hydrobates tristrami
Least storm-petrel, Hydrobates microsomus
Monteiro's storm-petrel, Hydrobates monteroi
Cape Verde storm-petrel, Hydrobates jabejabe

Shearwaters and petrels
Order: ProcellariiformesFamily: Procellariidae

The procellariids are the main group of medium-sized "true petrels", characterized by united nostrils with medium septum and a long outer functional primary.

Southern giant-petrel, Macronectes giganteus
Northern giant-petrel, Macronectes halli
Northern fulmar, Fulmarus glacialis
Southern fulmar, Fulmarus glacialoides
Cape petrel, Daption capense
Kermadec petrel, Pterodroma neglecta
Providence petrel, Pterodroma solandri
Barau's petrel, Pterodroma baraui
Mottled petrel, Pterodroma inexpectata
Juan Fernandez petrel, Pterodroma externa
Atlantic petrel, Pterodroma incerta
Galapagos petrel, Pterodroma phaeopygia (A)
Hawaiian petrel, Pterodroma sandwichensis
White-necked petrel, Pterodroma cervicalis
Bonin petrel, Pterodroma hypoleuca
Black-winged petrel, Pterodroma nigripennis
Gould's petrel, Pterodroma leucoptera
Stejneger's petrel, Pterodroma longirostris
Pycroft's petrel, Pterodroma pycrofti
Herald petrel, Pterodroma heraldica
Collared petrel, Pterodroma brevipes 
Great-winged petrel, Pterodroma macroptera
Grey-faced petrel, Pterodroma gouldi
Trindade petrel, Pterodroma arminjoniana 
Soft-plumaged petrel, Pterodroma mollis
White-headed petrel, Pterodroma lessonii
Cook's petrel, Pterodroma cookii
Vanuatu petrel, Pterodroma occulta
Murphy's petrel, Pterodroma ultima 
Fea's petrel, Pterodroma feae
Zino's petrel, Pterodroma madeira
Bermuda petrel, Pterodroma cahow
Black-capped petrel, Pterodroma hasitata
Phoenix petrel, Pterodroma alba
Antarctic prion, Pachyptila desolata
Slender-billed prion, Pachyptila belcheri
Broad-billed prion, Pachyptila vittata
Fairy prion, Pachyptila turtur
Salvin's prion, Pachyptila salvini
Fulmar prion, Pachyptila crassirostris
Bulwer's petrel, Bulweria bulwerii
Jouanin's petrel, Bulweria fallax
Mascarene petrel, Pseudobulweria aterrima
Tahiti petrel, Pseudobulweria rostrata
Beck's petrel, Pseudobulweria becki (A)
Fiji petrel, Pseudobulweria macgillivrayi
Streaked shearwater, Calonectris leucomelas
Cory's shearwater, Calonectris diomedea
Cape Verde shearwater, Calonectris edwardsii
Pink-footed shearwater, Ardenna creatopus (A)
Flesh-footed shearwater, Ardenna carneipes
Great shearwater, Ardenna gravis
Wedge-tailed shearwater, Ardenna pacificus
Buller's shearwater, Ardenna bulleri
Sooty shearwater, Ardenna griseus
Short-tailed shearwater, Ardenna tenuirostris
Christmas shearwater, Puffinus nativitatis
Manx shearwater, Puffinus puffinus
Yelkouan shearwater, Puffinus yelkouan
Balearic shearwater, Puffinus mauretanicus (A)
Bannerman's shearwater, Puffinus bannermani
Newell's shearwater, Puffinus newelli (A)
Bryan's shearwater, Puffinus bryani
Tropical shearwater, Puffinus bailloni
Persian shearwater, Puffinus persicus
Heinroth's shearwater, Puffinus heinrothi
Hutton's shearwater, Puffinus huttoni
Fluttering shearwater, Puffinus gavia
Little shearwater, Puffinus assimilis 
Subantarctic shearwater, Puffinus elegans
Barolo shearwater, Puffinus baroli
Boyd's shearwater, Puffinus boydi 
Audubon's shearwater, Puffinus iherminieri
Antarctic petrel, Thalasssoica antarctica
Snow petrel, Pagodroma nivea
Kerguelen petrel, Aphrodroma brevirostris
Blue petrel, Halobaena caerulea
Grey petrel, Procellaria cinerea
White-chinned petrel, Procellaria aequinoctailis
Parkinson's petrel, Procellaria parkinsoni
Westland petrel, Procellaria westlandica
Common diving-petrel, Pelecanoides urinatrix
South Georgian diving-petrel, Pelecanoides georgicus

Storks
Order: CiconiiformesFamily: Ciconiidae

Storks are large, long-legged, long-necked, wading birds with long, stout bills. Storks are mute, but bill-clattering is an important mode of communication at the nest. Their nests can be large and may be reused for many years. Many species are migratory.

Asian openbill, Anastomus oscitans
African openbill, Anastomus lamelligerus 
Black stork, Ciconia nigra
Abdim's stork, Ciconia abdimii
Asian woolly-necked stork, Ciconia episcopus
Storm's stork, Ciconia stormi
White stork, Ciconia ciconia
Oriental stork, Ciconia boyciana
Black-necked stork, Ephippiorhynchus asiaticus
Lesser adjutant, Leptoptilos javanicus
Marabou stork, Leptoptilos crumenifer (A)
Greater adjutant, Leptoptilos dubius
Milky stork, Mycteria cinerea
Yellow-billed stork, Mycteria ibis
Painted stork, Mycteria leucocephala
Saddle-billed stork, Ephippiorhynchus senegalensis

Frigatebirds
Order: SuliformesFamily: Fregatidae

Frigatebirds are large seabirds usually found over tropical oceans. They are large, black-and-white or completely black, with long wings and deeply forked tails. The males have colored inflatable throat pouches. They do not swim or walk and cannot take off from a flat surface. Having the largest wingspan-to-body-weight ratio of any bird, they are essentially aerial, able to stay aloft for more than a week.

Lesser frigatebird, Fregata ariel
Christmas Island frigatebird, Fregata andrewsi
Great frigatebird, Fregata minor

Boobies and gannets
Order: SuliformesFamily: Sulidae

The sulids comprise the gannets and boobies. Both groups are medium to large coastal seabirds that plunge-dive for fish.

Masked booby, Sula dactylatra
Nazca booby, Sula granti (A)
Brown booby, Sula leucogaster
Red-footed booby, Sula sula
Abbott's booby, Papasula abbotti
Northern gannet, Morus bassanus

Anhingas
Order: SuliformesFamily: Anhingidae

Anhingas or darters are cormorant-like water birds with long necks and long, straight bills. They are fish eaters which often swim with only their neck above the water.

Oriental darter, Anhinga melanogaster
Australasian darter, Anhinga novaehollandiae
African darter, Anhinga rufa

Cormorants and shags
Order: SuliformesFamily: Phalacrocoracidae

Cormorants are medium-to-large aquatic birds, usually with mainly dark plumage and areas of coloured skin on the face. The bill is long, thin and sharply hooked. Their feet are four-toed and webbed, a distinguishing feature among the order Pelecaniformes.

Little pied cormorant, Microcarbo melanoleucos
Little cormorant, Microcarbo niger
Pygmy cormorant, Microcarbo pygmeus
Long-tailed cormorant, Microcarbo africanus 
Red-faced cormorant, Urile urile
Pelagic cormorant, Urile pelagicus
Pallas's cormorant, Urile perspicillatus (X)
Great cormorant, Phalacrocorax carbo
Japanese cormorant, Phalacrocorax capillatus
Socotra cormorant, Phalacrocorax nigrogularis
Indian cormorant, Phalacrocorax fuscicollis
Little black cormorant, Phalacrocorax sulcirostris
Pied cormorant, Phalacrocorax varius
Spotted shag, Phalacrocorax punctatus 
Black-faced cormorant, Phalacrocorax fuscescens
European shag, Gulosus aristotelis
Kerguelen shag, Leucocarbo verrucosus
Macquarie shag, Leucocarbo purpurascens
Imperial shag, Leucocarbo atriceps

Pelicans
Order: PelecaniformesFamily: Pelecanidae

Pelicans are large water birds with distinctive pouches under their bills. Like other birds in the order Pelecaniformes, they have four webbed toes.

Great white pelican, Pelecanus onocrotalus
Australian pelican, Pelecanus conspicillatus
Pink-backed pelican, Pelecanus rufescens
Spot-billed pelican, Pelecanus philippensis
Dalmatian pelican, Pelecanus crispus

Hamerkop
Order: PelecaniformesFamily: Scopidae

The hamerkop is a medium-sized bird with a long shaggy crest. The shape of its head with a curved bill and crest at the back is reminiscent of a hammer, hence its name. Its plumage is drab-brown all over.

Hamerkop, Scopus umbretta

Herons, egrets, and bitterns
Order: PelecaniformesFamily: Ardeidae

The family Ardeidae contains the bitterns, herons, and egrets. Herons and egrets are medium to large wading birds with long necks and legs. Bitterns tend to be shorter necked and more wary. Members of Ardeidae fly with their necks retracted, unlike other long-necked birds such as storks, ibises, and spoonbills.

Great bittern, Botaurus stellaris
Australasian bittern, Botaurus poiciloptilus
American bittern, Botaurus lentiginosus 
Yellow bittern, Ixobrychus sinensis
Little bittern, Ixobrychus minutus
Black-backed bittern, Ixobrychus dubius
Schrenck's bittern, Ixobrychus eurhythmus
Cinnamon bittern, Ixobrychus cinnamomeus
Black bittern, Ixobrychus flavicollis
Dwarf bittern, Ixobrychus sturmii
Least bittern, Ixobrychus exilis
Forest bittern, Zonerodius heliosylus
Gray heron, Ardea cinerea
Pacific heron, Ardea pacifica
Black-headed heron, Ardea melanocephala
White-bellied heron, Ardea insignis
Great-billed heron, Ardea sumatrana
Goliath heron, Ardea goliath
Purple heron, Ardea purpurea
Great egret, Ardea alba
Intermediate egret, Ardea intermedia
White-faced heron, Egretta novaehollandiae
Chinese egret, Egretta eulophotes
Little egret, Egretta garzetta
Western reef-heron, Egretta gularis
Pacific reef-heron, Egretta sacra
Pied heron, Egretta picata
Black heron, Egretta ardesiaca
Little blue heron, Egretta caerulea 
Tricolored heron, Egretta tricolor
Cattle egret, Bubulcus ibis
Squacco heron, Ardeola ralloides
Indian pond-heron, Ardeola grayii
Chinese pond-heron, Ardeola bacchus
Javan pond-heron, Ardeola speciosa
Malagasy pond-heron, Ardeola idae
Striated heron, Butorides striata
Green heron, Butorides virescens
Black-crowned night-heron, Nycticorax nycticorax
Nankeen night-heron, Nycticorax caledonicus
White-eared night-heron, Gorsachius magnificus
Japanese night-heron, Gorsachius goisagi
Malayan night-heron, Gorsachius melanolophus
White-backed night-heron, Gorsachius leuconotus
Yellow-crowned night-heron, Nyctanassa violacea

Ibises and spoonbills
Order: PelecaniformesFamily: Threskiornithidae

Threskiornithidae is a family of large terrestrial and wading birds which includes the ibises and spoonbills. They have long, broad wings with 11 primary and about 20 secondary feathers. They are strong fliers and despite their size and weight, very capable soarers.

Glossy ibis, Plegadis falcinellus
Puna ibis, Plegadis ridgwayi
African sacred ibis, Threskiornis aethiopicus
Black-headed ibis, Threskiornis melanocephalus
Australian ibis, Threskiornis molucca
Straw-necked ibis, Threskiornis spinicollis
Red-naped ibis, Pseudibis papillosa
White-shouldered ibis, Pseudibis davisoni
Giant ibis, Pseudibis gigantea
Northern bald ibis, Geronticus eremita
Crested ibis, Nipponia nippon
Eurasian spoonbill, Platalea leucorodia
Royal spoonbill, Platalea regia
African spoonbill, Platalea alba
Black-faced spoonbill, Platalea minor
Yellow-billed spoonbill, Platalea flavipes (A)
Wattled ibis, Bostrychia carunculata
Buff-necked ibis, Theristicus caudatus

Osprey
Order: AccipitriformesFamily: Pandionidae

The family Pandionidae contains only one species, the osprey. The osprey is a medium-large raptor which is a specialist fish-eater with a worldwide distribution.

Osprey, Pandion haliaetus

Hawks, eagles, and kites
Order: AccipitriformesFamily: Accipitridae

Accipitridae is a family of birds of prey, which includes hawks, eagles, kites, harriers and Old World vultures. These birds have powerful hooked beaks for tearing flesh from their prey, strong legs, powerful talons and keen eyesight.

Black-winged kite, Elanus caeruleus
Black-shouldered kite, Elanus axillaris 
Letter-winged kite, Elanus scriptus
Scissor-tailed kite, Chelictinia riocourii
Bearded vulture, Gypaetus barbatus
Egyptian vulture, Neophron percnopterus
European honey-buzzard, Pernis apivorus
Sulawesi honey-buzzard, Pernis celebensis
Philippine honey-buzzard, Pernis steerei
Oriental honey-buzzard, Pernis ptilorhynchus
Long-tailed honey-buzzard, Henicopernis longicauda
Black honey-buzzard, Henicopernis infuscatus
Jerdon's baza, Aviceda jerdoni
Pacific baza, Aviceda subcristata
Black baza, Aviceda leuphotes
Red-headed vulture, Sarcogyps calvus
Cinereous vulture, Aegypius monachus
Lappet-faced vulture, Torgos tracheliotos
White-rumped vulture, Gyps bengalensis
Indian vulture, Gyps indicus
Slender-billed vulture, Gyps tenuirostris
Rüppell's griffon, Gyps rueppelli
Himalayan griffon, Gyps himalayensis
Eurasian griffon, Gyps fulvus
White-backed vulture, Gyps africanus
Nicobar serpent-eagle, Spilornis klossi
Sulawesi serpent-eagle, Spilornis rufipectus
Mountain serpent-eagle, Spilornis kinabaluensis
Crested serpent-eagle, Spilornis cheela
Philippine serpent-eagle, Spilornis holospilus
Andaman serpent-eagle, Spilornis elgini
Philippine eagle, Pithecophaga jefferyi
Bateleur, Terathopius ecaudatus
Short-toed snake-eagle, Circaetus gallicus
Beaudouin's snake-eagle, Circaetus beaudouini
Bat hawk, Macheiramphus alcinus
New Guinea eagle, Harpyopsis novaeguineae
Changeable hawk-eagle, Nisaetus cirrhatus
Flores hawk-eagle, Nisaetus floris
Mountain hawk-eagle, Nisaetus nipalensis
Legge's hawk-eagle, Nisaetus kelaarti
Blyth's hawk-eagle, Nisaetus alboniger
Javan hawk-eagle, Nisaetus bartelsi
Sulawesi hawk-eagle, Nisaetus lanceolatus
Philippine hawk-eagle, Nisaetus philippensis
Pinsker's hawk-eagle, Nisaetus philippensis
Wallace's hawk-eagle, Nisaetus nanus
Rufous-bellied eagle, Lophotriorchis kienerii
Black eagle, Ictinaetus malaiensis
Lesser spotted eagle, Clanga pomarina
Indian spotted eagle, Clanga hastata
Greater spotted eagle, Clanga clanga
Booted eagle, Hieraaetus pennatus
Pygmy eagle, Hieraaetus weiskei
Little eagle, Hieraaetus morphnoides
Wahlberg's eagle, Hieraaetus wahlbergi 
Tawny eagle, Aquila rapax
Steppe eagle, Aquila nipalensis
Imperial eagle, Aquila heliaca
Gurney's eagle, Aquila gurneyi
Golden eagle, Aquila chrysaetos
Wedge-tailed eagle, Aquila audax (A)
Verreaux's eagle, Aquila verreauxii
Bonelli's eagle, Aquila fasciata
Gabar goshawk, Micronisus gabar
White-eyed buzzard, Butastur teesa
Rufous-winged buzzard, Butastur liventer
Gray-faced buzzard, Butastur indicus
Eurasian marsh-harrier, Circus aeruginosus
Eastern marsh-harrier, Circus spilonotus
Papuan marsh-harrier, Circus spilothorax
Spotted harrier, Circus assimilis
Hen harrier, Circus cyaneus
Northern harrier, Circus hudsonius (A)
Pallid harrier, Circus macrourus
Pied harrier, Circus melanoleucos
Montagu's harrier, Circus pygargus
Swamp harrier, Circus approximans
Malagasy harrier, Circus macrosceles
Crested goshawk, Accipiter trivirgatus
Sulawesi goshawk, Accipiter griseiceps
Shikra, Accipiter badius
Nicobar sparrowhawk, Accipiter butleri
Levant sparrowhawk, Accipiter brevipes
Chinese sparrowhawk, Accipiter soloensis
Spot-tailed goshawk, Accipiter trinotatus
Variable goshawk, Accipiter hiogaster
Brown goshawk, Accipiter fasciatus
Black-mantled goshawk, Accipiter melanochlamys
Moluccan goshawk, Accipiter henicogrammus
Gray-headed goshawk, Accipiter poliocephalus
Japanese sparrowhawk, Accipiter gularis
Small sparrowhawk, Accipiter nanus
Besra, Accipiter virgatus
Rufous-necked sparrowhawk, Accipiter erythrauchen
Collared sparrowhawk, Accipiter cirrocephalus
Vinous-breasted sparrowhawk, Accipiter rhodogaster
Eurasian sparrowhawk, Accipiter nisus
Northern goshawk, Accipiter gentilis
Meyer's goshawk, Accipiter meyerianus
Gray goshawk, Accipiter novaehollandiae
Black goshawk, Accipiter melanoleucus
Pied goshawk, Accipiter albogularis
Slaty-mantled goshawk, Accipiter luteoschistaceus
Imitator sparrowhawk, Accipiter imitator
New Britain sparrowhawk, Accipiter brachyurus
Fiji goshawk, Accipiter rufitorques
Chestnut-shouldered goshawk, Erythrotriorchis buergersi
Doria's goshawk, Megatriorchis doriae
Red kite, Milvus milvus
Black kite, Milvus migrans
Whistling kite, Haliastur sphenurus
Brahminy kite, Haliastur indus
Bald eagle, Haliaeetus leucocephalus (A)
White-tailed eagle, Haliaeetus albicilla
Pallas's fish-eagle, Haliaeetus leucoryphus
Steller's sea-eagle, Haliaeetus pelagicus
White-bellied sea-eagle, Haliaeetus leucogaster
Lesser fish-eagle, Haliaeetus humilis
Gray-headed fish-eagle, Haliaeetus ichthyaetus
Sanford's sea-eagle, Haliaeetus sanfordi
Rough-legged hawk, Buteo lagopus
Common buzzard, Buteo buteo
Himalayan buzzard, Buteo refectus
Eastern buzzard, Buteo japonicus
Long-legged buzzard, Buteo rufinus
Upland buzzard, Buteo hemilasius
Socotra buzzard, Buteo socotraensis

Cape Verde buzzard, Buteo bannermani

Black-breasted kite, Hemirostra melanosternon
Square-tailed kite, Lophoictinia isura
Red goshawk, Erythrotriorchis radiatus
Hooded vulture, Necrocyrtes monachus 
Dark chanting-goshawk, Melierax metabates
Eastern chanting-goshawk, Melierax poliopterus

Barn-owls
Order: StrigiformesFamily: Tytonidae

Barn owls are medium to large owls with large heads and characteristic heart-shaped faces. They have long strong legs with powerful talons.

Sooty owl, Tyto tenebricosa
Australian masked-owl, Tyto novaehollandiae
Seram masked-owl, Tyto almae (E)
Lesser masked-owl, Tyto sororcula
Taliabu masked-owl, Tyto nigrobrunnea
Minahassa masked-owl, Tyto inexspectata
Sulawesi masked-owl, Tyto rosenbergii
Australasian grass-owl, Tyto longimembris
Barn owl, Tyto alba (A)
Andaman masked-owl, Tyto deroepstorffi
Golden masked-owl, Tyto aurantia
Manus masked-owl, Tyto manusi
Oriental bay-owl, Phodilus badius
Sri Lanka bay-owl, Phodilus assimilis

Owls
Order: StrigiformesFamily: Strigidae

The typical owls are small to large solitary nocturnal birds of prey. They have large forward-facing eyes and ears, a hawk-like beak and a conspicuous circle of feathers around each eye called a facial disk.

White-fronted scops-owl, Otus sagittatus
Andaman scops-owl, Otus balli
Reddish scops-owl, Otus rufescens
Serendib scops-owl, Otus thilohoffmanni
Flores scops-owl, Otus alfredi
Mountain scops-owl, Otus spilocephalus
Rajah scops-owl, Otus brookii
Javan scops-owl, Otus angelinae
Mentawai scops-owl, Otus mentawi
Indian scops-owl, Otus bakkamoena
Collared scops-owl, Otus lettia
Giant scops-owl, Otus gurneyi
Sunda scops-owl, Otus lempiji
Japanese scops-owl, Otus semitorques
Wallace's scops-owl, Otus silvicola
Palawan scops-owl, Otus fuliginosus
Philippine scops-owl, Otus megalotis
Everett's scops-owl, Otus everetti
Negros scops-owl, Otus nigrorum
Mindoro scops-owl, Otus mindorensis
Moluccan scops-owl, Otus magicus
Banggai scops-owl, Otus mendeni 
Wetar scops-owl, Otus tempestatis 
Rinjani scops-owl, Otus jolandae 
Mantanani scops-owl, Otus mantananensis
Ryukyu scops-owl, Otus elegans
Sulawesi scops-owl, Otus manadensis
Sangihe scops-owl, Otus collari
Siau scops-owl, Otus siaoensis
Sula scops-owl, Otus sulaensis
Biak scops-owl, Otus beccarii
Simeulue scops-owl, Otus umbra
Enggano scops-owl, Otus enganensis
Nicobar scops-owl, Otus alius
Eurasian scops-owl, Otus scops
Cyprus scops-owl, Otus cyprius
Pallid scops-owl, Otus brucei
Mindanao scops-owl, Otus mirus
Luzon scops-owl, Otus longicornis
Arabian scops-owl, Otus pamelae
Oriental scops-owl, Otus sunia
Socotra scops-owl, Otus socotranus
Eurasian eagle-owl, Bubo bubo
Rock eagle-owl, Bubo bengalensis
Pharaoh eagle-owl, Bubo ascalaphus
Spot-bellied eagle-owl, Bubo nipalensis
Barred eagle-owl, Bubo sumatranus
Dusky eagle-owl, Bubo coromandus
Philippine eagle-owl, Bubo philippensis
Snowy owl, Bubo scandiacus
Arabian eagle-owl, Bubo milesi
Grayish eagle-owl, Bubo cinerascens
Blakiston's fish-owl, Ketupa blakistoni
Brown fish-owl, Ketupa zeylonensis
Tawny fish-owl, Ketupa flavipes
Buffy fish-owl, Ketupa ketupu
Northern hawk owl, Surnia ulula
Eurasian pygmy-owl, Glaucidium passerinum
Asian barred owlet, Glaucidium cuculoides
Javan owlet, Glaucidium castanopterum
Jungle owlet, Glaucidium radiatum
Chestnut-backed owlet, Glaucidium castanotum
Collared owlet, Taenioptynx brodiei
Sunda owlet, Taenioptynx sylvaticus
Spotted owlet, Athene brama
Little owl, Athene noctua
Forest owlet, Athene blewitti
Spotted wood-owl, Strix seloputo
Mottled wood-owl, Strix ocellata
Brown wood-owl, Strix leptogrammica
Tawny owl, Strix aluco
Himalayan owl, Strix nivicolum
Desert owl, Strix hadorami
Ural owl, Strix uralensisGreat gray owl, Strix nebulosa
Omani owl, Strix butleri
Long-eared owl, Asio otus
Short-eared owl, Asio flammeus
Marsh owl, Asio capensis
Boreal owl, Aegolius funereus
Rufous owl, Ninox rufa
Barking owl, Ninox connivens
Sumba boobook, Ninox rudolfi
Andaman boobook, Ninox affinis
Alor boobook, Ninox plesseni
Rote boobook, Ninox rotiensis
Timor boobook, Ninox fusca
Southern boobook, Ninox boobook
Morepork, Ninox novaeseelandiae
Least boobook, Ninox sumbaensis
Brown boobook, Ninox scutulata
Hume's boobook, Ninox obscura
Northern boobook, Ninox japonica
Chocolate boobook, Ninox randi
Luzon boobook, Ninox philippensis
Mindanao boobook, Ninox spilocephala
Mindoro boobook, Ninox mindorensis
Romblon boobook, Ninox spilonotus
Cebu boobook, Ninox rumseyi
Camiguin boobook, Ninox leventis
Sulu boobook, Ninox reyi
Ochre-bellied boobook, Ninox ochracea
Togian boobook, Ninox burhani
Cinnabar boobook, Ninox ios
Halmahera boobook, Ninox hypogramma
Tanimbar boobook, Ninox forbesi
Seram boobook, Ninox squamipila
Buru boobook, Ninox hantu
Christmas Island boobook, Ninox natalis
Papuan boobook, Ninox theomacha
Speckled boobook, Ninox punctulata
Manus boobook, Ninox meeki
Bismarck boobook, Ninox variegata
New Britain boobook, Ninox odiosa
Solomons boobook, Ninox jacquinoti
Powerful owl, Ninox strenua
Christmas Island boobook, Ninox natalis
Papuan owl, Uroglaux dimorpha
Fearful owl, Nesasio solomonensis

TrogonsOrder: TrogoniformesFamily: Trogonidae

The family Trogonidae includes trogons and quetzals. Found in tropical woodlands worldwide, they feed on insects and fruit, and their broad bills and weak legs reflect their diet and arboreal habits. Although their flight is fast, they are reluctant to fly any distance. Trogons have soft, often colorful, feathers with distinctive male and female plumage.

Javan trogon, Harpactes reinwardtii
Sumatran trogon, Harpactes mackloti
Malabar trogon, Harpactes fasciatus
Red-naped trogon, Harpactes kasumba
Diard's trogon, Harpactes diardii
Philippine trogon, Harpactes ardens
Whitehead's trogon, Harpactes whiteheadi
Cinnamon-rumped trogon, Harpactes orrhophaeus
Scarlet-rumped trogon, Harpactes duvaucelii
Red-headed trogon, Harpactes erythrocephalus
Orange-breasted trogon, Harpactes oreskios
Ward's trogon, Harpactes wardi

HoopoesOrder: BucerotiformesFamily: Upupidae

Hoopoes have black, white and orangey-pink coloring with a long crest on their head, the plumage of which sweeps backward at rest but can be flexed to an erect position.

Eurasian hoopoe, Upupa epops

HornbillsOrder: BucerotiformesFamily: Bucerotidae

Hornbills are a group of birds whose bill is shaped like a cow's horn, but without a twist, sometimes with a casque on the upper mandible. Frequently, the bill is brightly colored.

African gray hornbill, Lophoceros nasutus
White-crowned hornbill, Berenicornis comatus
Helmeted hornbill, Buceros vigil
Rufous hornbill, Buceros hydrocorax
Rhinoceros hornbill, Buceros rhinoceros
Great hornbill, Buceros bicornis
Bushy-crested hornbill, Anorrhinus galeritus
Brown hornbill, Anorrhinus austeni
Rusty-cheeked hornbill, Anorrhinus tickelli
Indian gray hornbill, Ocyceros birostris
Malabar gray hornbill, Ocyceros griseus
Sri Lanka gray hornbill, Ocyceros gingalensis
Black hornbill, Anthracoceros malayanus
Sulu hornbill, Anthracoceros montani
Malabar pied-hornbill, Anthracoceros coronatus
Oriental pied-hornbill, Anthracoceros albirostris
Palawan hornbill, Anthracoceros marchei
Rufous-necked hornbill, Aceros nipalensis
Knobbed hornbill, Rhyticeros cassidix
Sumba hornbill, Rhyticeros everetti
Wreathed hornbill, Rhyticeros undulatus
Plain-pouched hornbill, Rhyticeros subruficollis
Narcondam hornbill, Rhyticeros narcondami
Blyth's hornbill, Rhyticeros plicatus
Sulawesi hornbill, Rhabdotorrhinus exarhatus
Wrinkled hornbill, Rhabdotorrhinus corrugatus
Writhe-billed hornbill, Rhabdotorrhinus waldeni
Writhed hornbill, Rhabdotorrhinus leucocephalus
Visayan hornbill, Penelopides panini
Luzon hornbill, Penelopides manillae
Mindoro hornbill, Penelopides mindorensis
Samar hornbill, Penelopides samarensis
Mindanao hornbill, Penelopides affinis

KingfishersOrder: CoraciiformesFamily: Alcedinidae

Kingfishers are medium-sized birds with large heads, long, pointed bills, short legs and stubby tails.

Blyth's kingfisher, Alcedo hercules
Common kingfisher, Alcedo atthis
Blue-eared kingfisher, Alcedo meninting
Javan blue-banded kingfisher, Alcedo euryzona
Malaysian blue-banded kingfisher, Alcedo peninsulae
Small blue kingfisher, Alcedo coerulescens
Azure kingfisher, Ceyx azureus
Indigo-banded kingfisher, Ceyx cyanopectus
Northern silvery-kingfisher, Ceyx flumenicola
Southern silvery-kingfisher, Ceyx argentatus
Little kingfisher, Ceyx pusillus
Black-backed dwarf-kingfisher, Ceyx erithaca
Rufous-backed dwarf-kingfisher, Ceyx rufidorsa
Philippine dwarf-kingfisher, Ceyx melanurus
Sulawesi dwarf-kingfisher, Ceyx fallax
Sangihe dwarf-kingfisher, Ceyx sangirensis
Dimorphic dwarf-kingfisher, Ceyx margarethae
Sula dwarf-kingfisher, Ceyx wallacii
Moluccan dwarf-kingfisher, Ceyx lepidus
Buru dwarf-kingfisher, Ceyx cajeli
Papuan dwarf-kingfisher, Ceyx solitarius
Bismarck kingfisher, Ceyx websteri
Manus dwarf-kingfisher, Ceyx dispar
New Ireland dwarf-kingfisher, Ceyx mulcatus
New Britain dwarf-kingfisher, Ceyx sacerdotis
North Solomons dwarf-kingfisher, Ceyx meeki
Malachite kingfisher, Corythornis cristatus
Banded kingfisher, Lacedo pulchella
Blue-winged kookaburra, Dacelo leachii
Spangled kookaburra, Dacelo tyro
Rufous-bellied kookaburra, Dacelo gaudichaud
Shovel-billed kookaburra, Clytoceyx rex
Sulawesi lilac kingfisher, Cittura cyanotis
Sangihe lilac kingfisher, Cittura sanghirensis
Brown-winged kingfisher, Pelargopsis amauroptera
Stork-billed kingfisher, Pelargopsis capensis
Great-billed kingfisher, Pelargopsis melanorhyncha
Ruddy kingfisher, Halcyon coromanda
White-throated kingfisher, Halcyon smyrnensis
Brown-breasted kingfisher, Halcyon gularis
Gray-headed kingfisher, Halcyon leucocephala
Black-capped kingfisher, Halcyon pileata
Javan kingfisher, Halcyon cyanoventris
Blue-black kingfisher, Todiramphus nigrocyaneus
Rufous-lored kingfisher, Todiramphus winchelli
Blue-and-white kingfisher, Todiramphus diops
Lazuli kingfisher, Todiramphus lazuli
Forest kingfisher, Todiramphus macleayii
Guam kingfisher, Todiramphus cinnamominus
Torresian kingfisher, Todiramphus sordidus
Sacred kingfisher, Todiramphus sanctus
Collared kingfisher, Todiramphus chloris
Beach kingfisher, Todiramphus saurophagus
Sombre kingfisher, Todiramphus funebris
Talaud kingfisher, Todiramphus enigma
Cinnamon-banded kingfisher, Todiramphus australasia
New Britain kingfisher, Todiramphus albonotatus
Ultramarine kingfisher, Todiramphus leucopygius
Pohnpei kingfisher, Todiramphus reichenbachii
Colonist kingfisher, Todiramphus colonus
Melanesian kingfisher, Todiramphus tristrami
Red-backed kingfisher, Todiramphus pyrrhopygia
Pacific kingfisher, Todiramphus sacer
White-rumped kingfisher, Caridonax fulgidus
Hook-billed kingfisher, Melidora macrorrhina
Rufous-collared kingfisher, Actenoides concretus
Spotted kingfisher, Actenoides lindsayi
Blue-capped kingfisher, Actenoides hombroni
Green-backed kingfisher, Actenoides monachus
Scaly-breasted kingfisher, Actenoides princeps
Moustached kingfisher, Actenoides bougainvillei
Yellow-billed kingfisher, Syma torotoro
Mountain kingfisher, Syma megarhyncha
Little paradise-kingfisher, Tanysiptera hydrocharis
Common paradise-kingfisher, Tanysiptera galatea
Kofiau paradise-kingfisher, Tanysiptera ellioti
Biak paradise-kingfisher, Tanysiptera riedelii
Numfor paradise-kingfisher, Tanysiptera carolinae
Red-breasted paradise-kingfisher, Tanysiptera nympha
Brown-headed paradise-kingfisher, Tanysiptera danae
Buff-breasted paradise-kingfisher, Tanysiptera sylvia
Black-capped paradise-kingfisher, Tanysiptera nigriceps
Crested kingfisher, Megaceryle lugubris
Pied kingfisher, Ceryle rudis

Bee-eatersOrder: CoraciiformesFamily: Meropidae

The bee-eaters are a group of near passerine birds in the family Meropidae. Most species are found in Africa but others occur in southern Europe, Madagascar, Australia and New Guinea. They are characterized by richly colored plumage, slender bodies and usually elongated central tail feathers. All are colorful and have long downturned bills and pointed wings, which give them a swallow-like appearance when seen from afar.

Red-bearded bee-eater, Nyctyornis amictus
Blue-bearded bee-eater, Nyctyornis athertoni
Purple-bearded bee-eater, Meropogon forsteni
White-throated bee-eater, Merops albicollis
Asian green bee-eater, Merops orientalis
Arabian green bee-eater, Merops cyanophrys
Blue-throated bee-eater, Merops viridis
Rufous-crowned bee-eater, Merops americanus
Blue-cheeked bee-eater, Merops persicus
Blue-tailed bee-eater, Merops philippinus
Rainbow bee-eater, Merops ornatus
European bee-eater, Merops apiaster
Chestnut-headed bee-eater, Merops leschenaulti
Somali bee-eater, Merops revoilii
Madagascar bee-eater, Merops superciliosus (A)

RollersOrder: CoraciiformesFamily: Coraciidae

Rollers resemble crows in size and build, but are more closely related to the kingfishers and bee-eaters. They share the colorful appearance of those groups with blues and browns predominating. The two inner front toes are connected, but the outer toe is not.

European roller, Coracias garrulus
Abyssinian roller, Coracias abyssinicus
Lilac-breasted roller, Coracias caudatus
Rufous-crowned roller, Coracias noevius
Indian roller, Coracias benghalensis
Indochinese roller, Coracias affinis
Purple-winged roller, Coracias temminckii
Broad-billed roller, Eurystomus glaucurus
Dollarbird, Eurystomus orientalis
Azure roller, Eurystomus azureus

Asian barbetsOrder: PiciformesFamily: Megalaimidae

The Asian barbets are plump birds, with short necks and large heads. They get their name from the bristles which fringe their heavy bills. Most species are brightly colored.

Sooty barbet, Caloramphus hayii
Brown barbet, Caloramphus fuliginosus
Malabar barbet, Psilopogon malabaricus
Crimson-fronted barbet, Psilopogon rubricapillus
Coppersmith barbet, Psilopogon haemacephala
Blue-eared barbet, Psilopogon australis
Little barbet, Psilopogon australis
Bornean barbet, Psilopogon eximus
Fire-tufted barbet, Psilopogon pyrolophus
Great barbet, Psilopogon virens
Red-vented barbet, Psilopogon lagrandieri
Red-crowned barbet, Psilopogon rafflesii
Red-throated barbet, Psilopogon mystacophanos
Black-banded barbet, Psilopogon javensis
Golden-naped barbet, Psilopogon pulcherrimus
Yellow-crowned barbet, Psilopogon henricii
Flame-fronted barbet, Psilopogon armillaris
Green-eared barbet, Psilopogon faiostrictus
Lineated barbet, Psilopogon lineatus
Brown-headed barbet, Psilopogon zeylanicus
White-cheeked barbet, Psilopogon viridis
Yellow-fronted barbet, Psilopogon flavifrons
Golden-throated barbet, Psilopogon franklinii
Necklaced barbet, Psilopogon auricularis
Mountain barbet, Psilopogon monticola
Brown-throated barbet, Psilopogon corvinus
Golden-whiskered barbet, Psilopogon chrysopogon
Moustached barbet, Psilopogon incognitus
Taiwan barbet, Psilopogon nuchalis
Chinese barbet, Psilopogon faber
Blue-throated barbet, Psilopogon asiaticus
Indochinese barbet, Psilopogon annamensis
Black-browed barbet, Psilopogon oorti
Turquoise-throated barbet, Psilopogon chersonesus

HoneyguidesOrder: PiciformesFamily: Indicatoridae

Honeyguides are among the few birds that feed on wax. They are named for the greater honeyguide which leads traditional honey-hunters to bees' nests and, after the hunters have harvested the honey, feeds on the remaining contents of the hive.

Yellow-rumped honeyguide, Indicator xanthonotus
Malaysian honeyguide, Indicator archipelagicus

WoodpeckersOrder: PiciformesFamily: Picidae

Woodpeckers are small to medium-sized birds with chisel-like beaks, short legs, stiff tails and long tongues used for capturing insects. Some species have feet with two toes pointing forward and two backward, while several species have only three toes. Many woodpeckers have the habit of tapping noisily on tree trunks with their beaks.

Eurasian wryneck, Jynx torquilla
Speckled piculet, Picumnus innominatus
Rufous piculet, Sasia abnormis
White-browed piculet, Sasia ochracea
Gray-and-buff woodpecker, Hemicircus concretus
Heart-spotted woodpecker, Hemicircus canente
Eurasian three-toed woodpecker, Picoides tridactylus
Sulawesi pygmy woodpecker, Yungipicus temminckii
Philippine pygmy woodpecker, Yungipicus maculatus
Sulu pygmy woodpecker, Yungipicus ramsayi
Brown-capped pygmy woodpecker, Yungipicus nanus
Sunda pygmy woodpecker, Yungipicus moluccensis
Gray-capped pygmy woodpecker, Yungipicus canicapillus
Japanese pygmy woodpecker, Yungipicus kizuki
Yellow-crowned woodpecker, Leiopicus mahrattensis
Middle spotted woodpecker, Dendrocoptes medius
Brown-fronted woodpecker, Dendrocoptes auriceps
Arabian woodpecker, Dendrocoptes dorae
Rufous-bellied woodpecker, Dendrocopos hyperythrus
Fulvous-breasted woodpecker, Dendrocopos macei
Freckle-breasted woodpecker, Dendrocopos analis
Stripe-breasted woodpecker, Dendrocopos atratus
Okinawa woodpecker, Dendrocopos noguchii
White-backed woodpecker, Dendrocopos leucotos
Darjeeling woodpecker, Dendrocopos darjellensis
Great spotted woodpecker, Dendrocopos major
White-winged woodpecker, Dendrocopos leucopterus
Himalayan woodpecker, Dendrocopos himalayensis
Syrian woodpecker, Dendrocopos syriacus
Sind woodpecker, Dendrocopos assimilis
Lesser spotted woodpecker, Dryobates minor
Crimson-breasted woodpecker, Dryobates cathpharius
Maroon woodpecker, Blythipicus rubiginosus
Bay woodpecker, Blythipicus pyrrhotis
Orange-backed woodpecker, Reinwardtipicus validus
Greater flameback, Chrysocolaptes guttacristatus
Javan flameback, Chrysocolaptes strictus
Luzon flameback, Chrysocolaptes haematribon
Yellow-faced flameback, Chrysocolaptes xanthocephalus
Buff-spotted flameback, Chrysocolaptes lucidus
Red-headed flameback, Chrysocolaptes erythrocephalus
Crimson-backed flameback, Chrysocolaptes stricklandi
White-naped woodpecker, Chrysocolaptes festivus
Rufous woodpecker, Micropternus brachyurus
Buff-necked woodpecker, Meiglyptes tukki
Buff-rumped woodpecker, Meiglyptes tristis
Black-and-buff woodpecker, Meiglyptes jugularis
Pale-headed woodpecker, Gecinulus grantia
Bamboo woodpecker, Gecinulus viridis
Olive-backed woodpecker, Dinopium rafflesii
Himalayan flameback, Dinopium shorii
Common flameback, Dinopium javanense
Spot-throated flameback, Dinopium everetti
Black-rumped flameback, Dinopium benghalense
Red-backed flameback, Dinopium psarodes
Lesser yellownape, Picus chlorolophus
Crimson-winged woodpecker, Picus puniceus
Streak-throated woodpecker, Picus xanthopygaeus
Scaly-bellied woodpecker, Picus squamatus
Red-collared woodpecker, Picus rabieri
Streak-breasted woodpecker, Picus viridanus
Laced woodpecker, Picus vittatus
Japanese woodpecker, Picus awokera
Gray-headed woodpecker, Picus canus
Black-headed woodpecker, Picus erythropygius
Eurasian green woodpecker, Picus viridis
Levaillant's woodpecker, Picus vaillantii
Banded woodpecker, Chrysophlegma mineaceum
Greater yellownape, Chrysophlegma flavinucha
Checker-throated woodpecker, Chrysophlegma mentale
Ashy woodpecker, Mulleripicus fulvus
Northern sooty-woodpecker, Mulleripicus funebris 
Southern sooty-woodpecker, Mulleripicus fuliginosus
Great slaty woodpecker, Mulleripicus pulverulentus
Amami woodpecker, Dendrocopos owstoni
White-bellied woodpecker, Dryocopus javensis
Andaman woodpecker, Dryocopus hodgei
Black woodpecker, Dryocopus martius

Falcons and caracarasOrder: FalconiformesFamily: Falconidae

Falconidae is a family of diurnal birds of prey. They differ from hawks, eagles and kites in that they kill with their beaks instead of their talons.

White-rumped falcon, Polihierax insignis
Collared falconet, Microhierax caerulescens
Black-thighed falconet, Microhierax fringillarius
White-fronted falconet, Microhierax latifrons
Philippine falconet, Microhierax erythrogenys
Pied falconet, Microhierax melanoleucos
Lesser kestrel, Falco naumanni
Eurasian kestrel, Falco tinnunculus
Spotted kestrel, Falco moluccensis
Nankeen kestrel, Falco cenchroides
American kestrel, Falco sparverius (A)
Red-necked falcon, Falco chicquera
Red-footed falcon, Falco vespertinus
Amur falcon, Falco amurensis
Eleonora's falcon, Falco eleonorae
Sooty falcon, Falco concolor
Merlin, Falco columbarius
Eurasian hobby, Falco subbuteo
Oriental hobby, Falco severus
Australian hobby, Falco longipennis
Brown falcon, Falco berigora
Gray falcon, Falco hypoleucos
Lanner falcon, Falco biarmicus
Laggar falcon, Falco jugger
Saker falcon, Falco cherrug
Gyrfalcon, Falco rusticolus
Peregrine falcon, Falco peregrinus
Barbary falcon, Falco peregrinus pelegrinoides
Black falcon, Falco subniger
Malagasy kestrel, Falco newtoni
Seychelles kestrel, Falco araea

CockatoosOrder: PsittaciformesFamily: Cacatuidae

The cockatoos share many features with other parrots including the characteristic curved beak shape and a zygodactyl foot, with two forward toes and two backwards toes. They differ, however in a number of characteristics, including the often spectacular movable headcrest.

Palm cockatoo, Probosciger aterrimus
Little corella, Cacatua sanguinea 
Tanimbar corella, Cacatua goffiniana
Philippine cockatoo, Cacatua haematuropygia
Yellow-crested cockatoo, Cacatua sulphurea
Sulphur-crested cockatoo, Cacatua galerita
Eleonora cockatoo, Cacatua galerita eleonora
Salmon-crested cockatoo, Cacatua moluccensis
White cockatoo, Cacatua alba

Old World parrotsOrder: PsittaciformesFamily: Psittaculidae

Characteristic features of parrots include a strong curved bill, an upright stance, strong legs, and clawed zygodactyl feet. Many parrots are vividly coloured, and some are multi-coloured. Old World parrots are found from Africa east across south and southeast Asia and Oceania to Australia and New Zealand.

Pesquet's parrot, Psittrichas fulgidus
Yellow-capped pygmy-parrot, Micropsitta keiensis
Geelvink pygmy-parrot, Micropsitta geelvinkiana
Buff-faced pygmy-parrot, Micropsitta pusio
Red-breasted pygmy-parrot, Micropsitta bruijnii
Meek's pygmy-parrot, Micropsitta meeki
Finsch's pygmy-parrot, Micropsitta finschii
Moluccan king-parrot, Alisterus amboinensis
Papuan king-parrot, Alisterus chloropterus
Australian king-parrot, Alisterus scapularis
Olive-shouldered parrot, Aprosmictus jonquillaceus
Red-winged parrot, Aprosmictus erythropterus
Buru racket-tail, Prioniturus mada
Golden-mantled racket-tail, Prioniturus platurus
Mindanao racket-tail, Prioniturus waterstradti
Luzon racket-tail, Prioniturus montanus
Blue-headed racket-tail, Prioniturus platenae
Mindoro racket-tail, Prioniturus mindorensis
Blue-winged racket-tail, Prioniturus verticalis
Yellow-breasted racket-tail, Prioniturus flavicans
Green racket-tail, Prioniturus luconensis
Blue-crowned racket-tail, Prioniturus discurus
Eclectus parrot, Eclectus roratus
Red-cheeked parrot, Geoffroyus geoffroyi
Blue-collared parrot, Geoffroyus simplex
Singing parrot, Geoffroyus heteroclitus
Blue-rumped parrot, Psittinus cyanurus
Alexandrine parakeet, Psittacula eupatria
Rose-ringed parakeet, Psittacula krameri
Slaty-headed parakeet, Psittacula himalayana
Gray-headed parakeet, Psittacula finschii
Plum-headed parakeet, Psittacula cyanocephala
Blossom-headed parakeet, Psittacula roseata
Malabar parakeet, Psittacula columboides
Layard's parakeet, Psittacula calthrapae
Derbyan parakeet, Psittacula derbiana
Red-breasted parakeet, Psittacula alexandri
Nicobar parakeet, Psittacula caniceps
Long-tailed parakeet, Psittacula longicauda
Painted tiger-parrot, Psittacella picta
Brehm's tiger-parrot, Psittacella brehmii
Modest tiger-parrot, Psittacella modesta
Madarasz's tiger-parrot, Psittacella madaraszi
Black-lored parrot, Tanygnathus gramineus
Great-billed parrot, Tanygnathus megalorynchos
Blue-naped parrot, Tanygnathus lucionensis
Azure-rumped parrot, Tanygnathus sumatranus
Yellow-billed lorikeet, Neopsittacus musschenbroekii
Orange-billed lorikeet, Neopsittacus pullicauda
Orange-breasted fig-parrot, Cyclopsitta gulielmitertii
Double-eyed fig-parrot, Cyclopsitta diophthalma
Large fig-parrot, Psittaculirostris desmarestii
Edwards's fig-parrot, Psittaculirostris edwardsii
Salvadori's fig-parrot, Psittaculirostris salvadorii
Guaiabero, Bolbopsittacus lunulatus
Budgerigar, Melopsittacus undulatus (I)
Plum-faced lorikeet, Oreopsittacus arfaki
Pygmy lorikeet, Charminetta wilhelminae
Red-fronted lorikeet, Hypocharmosyna rubronotata
Red-flanked lorikeet, Hypocharmosyna placentis
Blue-fronted lorikeet, Charmosynopsis toxopei
Fairy lorikeet, Charmosynopsis pulchella
Striated lorikeet, Synorhacma multistriata
Duchess lorikeet, Charmosynoides margarethae
Red-chinned lorikeet, Charmosyna rubrigularis
Josephine's lorikeet, Charmosyna josefinae
Papuan lorikeet, Charmosyna papou
Meek's lorikeet, Charmosyna meeki
Red-throated lorikeet, Charmosyna amabilis
Black lory, Chalcopsitta atra
Brown lory, Chalcopsitta duivenbodei
Yellow-streaked lory, Chalcopsitta scintillata
Chattering lory, Lorius garrulus
Purple-naped lory, Lorius domicella
Black-capped lory, Lorius lory
Purple-bellied lory, Lorius hypoinochrous
White-naped lory, Lorius albidinuchus 
Goldie's lorikeet, Glossoptila goldiei
Red-and-blue lory, Eos histrio
Violet-necked lory, Eos squamata
Red lory, Eos bornea
Blue-streaked lory, Eos reticulata
Black-winged lory, Eos cyanogenia
Blue-eared lory, Eos semilarvata
Dusky lory, Pseudeos fuscata
Cardinal lory, Pseudeos cardinalis 
Ornate lorikeet, Saudareos ornatus
Mindanao lorikeet, Saudareos johnstoniae
Iris lorikeet, Saudareos iris
Yellow-cheeked lorikeet, Saudareos meyeri
Sula lorikeet, Saudareos flavoviridis
Sunset lorikeet, Trichoglossus forsteni
Leaf lorikeet, Trichoglossus weberi
Marigold lorikeet, Trichoglossus capistratus
Coconut lorikeet, Trichoglossus haematodus
Red-collared lorikeet, Trichoglossus rubritorquis
Olive-headed lorikeet, Trichoglossus euteles
Rainbow lorikeet, Trichoglossus moluccanus 
Vernal hanging-parrot, Loriculus vernalis
Sri Lanka hanging-parrot, Loriculus beryllinus
Philippine hanging-parrot, Loriculus philippensis
Camiguin hanging-parrot, Loriculus camiguinensis
Blue-crowned hanging-parrot, Loriculus galgulus
Sulawesi hanging-parrot, Loriculus stigmatus
Sula hanging-parrot, Loriculus sclateri
Moluccan hanging-parrot, Loriculus amabilis
Sangihe hanging-parrot, Loriculus catamene
Papuan hanging-parrot, Loriculus aurantiifrons
Pygmy hanging-parrot, Loriculus exilis
Yellow-throated hanging-parrot, Loriculus pusillus
Wallace's hanging-parrot, Loriculus flosculus
Green-fronted hanging-parrot, Loriculus tener
Niam-Niam parrot, Poicephalus crassus
Yellow-crowned parrot, Amazona ochrocephala
Turquoise-fronted parrot, Amazona aestiva
Monk parakeet,  Myiopsitta monachus
Rosy-faced lovebird, Agapornis roseicollis 
Nyasa lovebird, Agapornis lilianae 
Yellow-collared lovebird, Agapornis personatus
Fischer's lovebird, Agapornis fishcheri 
Red-headed lovebird, Agapornis pullarius
Nanday parakeet, Aratinga nenday
Eastern rosella, Platycercus eximius
Crimson rosella, Platycerus elegans 
Pale-headed rosella, Platycerus adscitus
Western rosella, Platycerus  icterotis
Dusky parrot, Pionus fuscus
Red-masked parakeet, Psittacara erythrogenys
Blue-crowned parakeet, Psittacara acuticaudatus
Crimson shining-parrot, Prosopeia splendens
Red shining-parrot, Prosopeia tabuensis
Masked shining-parrot, Prosopeia personata
Collared lory, Phigys solitarius
Blue-crowned lorikeet, Vini australis

Tyrant flycatchers
Great kiskadee, Pitangus sulphuratus
Olive-sided flycatcher, Contopus cooperi
Eastern wood-pewee, Contopus virnes
Yellow-bellied flycatcher, Empidonax flaviventris
Acadian flycatcher, Empidonax virescens
Alder flycatcher, Empidonax alnorum 
Least flycatcher, Empidonax  minimus
Eastern phoebe, Sayornis phoebe
Western kingbird, Tyrannus verticalis
Eastern kingbird, Tyrannus tyrannus
Fork-tailed flycatcher, Tyrannus savana

African and green broadbillsOrder: PasseriformesFamily: Calyptomenidae

The African and green broadbills are small, brightly coloured birds which feed on fruit and also take insects in flycatcher fashion, snapping their broad bills. Their habitat is canopies of wet forests.

Green broadbill, Calyptomena viridis
Hose's broadbill, Calyptomena hosii
Whitehead's broadbill, Calyptomena whiteheadi

Asian and Grauer's broadbillsOrder: PasseriformesFamily: Eurylaimidae

The Asian and Grauer's broadbills are small, brightly colored birds, which feed on fruit and also take insects in flycatcher fashion, snapping their broad bills. Their habitat is canopies of wet forests.

Black-and-red broadbill, Cymbirhynchus macrorhynchos
Long-tailed broadbill, Psarisomus dalhousiae
Silver-breasted broadbill, Serilophus lunatus
Banded broadbill, Eurylaimus javanicus
Black-and-yellow broadbill, Eurylaimus ochromalus
Wattled broadbill, Sarcophanops steerii
Visayan broadbill, Sarcophanops samarensis
Dusky broadbill, Corydon sumatranus

PittasOrder: PasseriformesFamily: Pittidae

Pittas are medium-sized stocky passerines with fairly long, strong legs, short tails, and stout bills. Many are brightly coloured. They spend the majority of their time on wet forest floors, eating snails, insects, and similar invertebrate prey.

Whiskered pitta, Erythropitta kochi
Blue-breasted pitta, Erythropitta erythrogaster
Sangihe pitta, Erythropitta caeruleitorques
Siau pitta, Erythropitta palliceps
Sulawesi pitta, Erythropitta celebensis
Sula pitta, Erythropitta dohertyi
North Moluccan pitta, Erythropitta rufiventris
South Moluccan pitta, Erythropitta rubrinucha
Papuan pitta, Erythropitta macklotii
Graceful pitta, Erythropitta venusta
Black-crowned pitta, Erythropitta ussheri
Blue-banded pitta, Erythropitta arcuata
Garnet pitta, Erythropitta granatina
New Ireland pitta, Erythropitta novaehibernicae
Tabar pitta, Erythropitta splendida
New Britain pitta, Erythropitta gazellae
Louisiade pitta, Erythropitta meeki
Eared pitta, Hydrornis phayrei
Rusty-naped pitta, Hydrornis oatesi
Blue-naped pitta, Hydrornis nipalensis
Blue-rumped pitta, Hydrornis soror
Giant pitta, Hydrornis caerulea
Schneider's pitta, Hydrornis schneideri
Malayan banded-pitta, Hydrornis irena
Javan banded-pitta, Hydrornis guajana
Bornean banded-pitta, Hydrornis schwaneri
Blue-headed pitta, Hydrornis baudii
Blue pitta, Hydrornis cyanea
Bar-bellied pitta, Hydrornis elliotii
Gurney's pitta, Hydrornis gurneyi
Indian pitta, Pitta brachyura
Blue-winged pitta, Pitta moluccensis
Fairy pitta, Pitta nympha
Hooded pitta, Pitta sordida
Azure-breasted pitta, Pitta steerii
Noisy pitta, Pitta versicolor
Ivory-breasted pitta, Pitta maxima
Ornate pitta, Pitta concinna
Elegant pitta, Pitta elegans
Banda Sea pitta, Pitta vigorsii
Mangrove pitta, Pitta megarhyncha
Black-faced pitta, Pitta anerythra
Superb pitta, Pitta superba

BowerbirdsOrder: PasseriformesFamily: Ptilonorhynchidae

The bowerbirds are small to medium-sized passerine birds. The males notably build a bower to attract a mate. Depending on the species, the bower ranges from a circle of cleared earth with a small pile of twigs in the center to a complex and highly decorated structure of sticks and leaves.

White-eared catbird, Ailuroedus buccoides
Ochre-breasted catbird, Ailuroedus stonii
Tan-capped catbird, Ailuroedus geislerorum
Northern catbird, Ailuroedus jobiensis
Arfak catbird, Ailuroedus arfakianus
Black-eared catbird, Ailuroedus melanotis
Huon catbird, Ailuroedus astigmaticus
Black-capped catbird, Ailuroedus melanocephalus
Archbold's bowerbird, Archboldia papuensis
Vogelkop bowerbird, Amblyornis inornata
MacGregor's bowerbird, Amblyornis macgregoriae
Streaked bowerbird, Amblyornis subalaris
Golden-fronted bowerbird, Amblyornis flavifrons
Masked bowerbird, Sericulus aureus
Flame bowerbird, Sericulus ardens
Fire-maned bowerbird, Sericulus bakeri
Yellow-breasted bowerbird, Chlamydera lauterbachi
Fawn-breasted bowerbird, Chlamydera cerviniventris

Australasian treecreepersOrder: PasseriformesFamily: Climacteridae

The Climacteridae are medium-small, mostly brown-coloured birds with patterning on their underparts. They are endemic to Australia and New Guinea.

 Papuan treecreeper, Cormobates placens

FairywrensOrder: PasseriformesFamily: Maluridae

Maluridae is a family of small, insectivorous passerine birds endemic to Australia and New Guinea. They are socially monogamous and sexually promiscuous, meaning that although they form pairs between one male and one female, each partner will mate with other individuals and even assist in raising the young from such pairings.

 Wallace's fairywren, Sipodotus wallacii 
 Orange-crowned fairywren, Clytomyias insignis 
 Broad-billed fairywren, Chenorhamphus grayi 
 Campbell's fairywren, Chenorhamphus campbelli
 Emperor fairywren, Malurus cyanocephalus 
 White-shouldered fairywren, Malurus alboscapulatus

HoneyeatersOrder: PasseriformesFamily: Meliphagidae

The honeyeaters are a large and diverse family of small to medium-sized birds most common in Australia and New Guinea. They are nectar feeders and closely resemble other nectar-feeding passerines.

Dark-eared myza, Myza celebensis
White-eared myza, Myza sarasinorum
Plain honeyeater, Pycnopygius ixoides
Marbled honeyeater, Pycnopygius cinereus
Streak-headed honeyeater, Pycnopygius stictocephalus
Orange-cheeked honeyeater, Oreornis chrysogenys
Puff-backed honeyeater, Meliphaga aruensis
Yellow-spotted honeyeater, Meliphaga notata
Scrub honeyeater, Microptilotis albonotatus
Mountain honeyeater, Microptilotis orientalis
Mimic honeyeater, Microptilotis analogus
Forest honeyeater, Microptilotis montanus
Mottled honeyeater, Microptilotis mimikae
Yellow-gaped honeyeater, Microptilotis flavirictus
Tagula honeyeater, Microptilotis vicina
Graceful honeyeater, Microptilotis gracilis
Elegant honeyeater, Microptilotis cinereifrons
Streak-breasted honeyeater, Territornis reticulata
Black-throated honeyeater, Caligavis subfrenata
Obscure honeyeater, Caligavis obscura
Sooty melidectes, Melidectes fuscus
Short-bearded melidectes, Melidectes nouhuysi
Ornate melidectes, Melidectes torquatus
Cinnamon-browed melidectes, Melidectes ochromelas
Vogelkop melidectes, Melidectes leucostephes
Huon melidectes, Melidectes foersteri
Belford's melidectes, Melidectes belfordi
Yellow-browed melidectes, Melidectes rufocrissalis
Long-bearded melidectes, Melidectes princeps
Varied honeyeater, Gavicalis versicolor
Yellow-tinted honeyeater, Ptilotula flavescens
Bougainville honeyeater, Stresemannia bougainvillei
Brown-backed honeyeater, Ramsayornis modestus
Rufous-banded honeyeater, Conopophila albogularis
Arfak honeyeater, Melipotes gymnops
Smoky honeyeater, Melipotes fumigatus
Foja honeyeater, Melipotes carolae
Spangled honeyeater, Melipotes ater
MacGregor's honeyeater, Macgregoria pulchra
Long-billed honeyeater, Melilestes megarhynchus
Olive straightbill, Timeliopsis fulvigula
Tawny straightbill, Timeliopsis griseigula
Bismarck honeyeater, Vosea whitemanensis
Seram myzomela, Myzomela blasii
Ruby-throated myzomela, Myzomela eques
Dusky myzomela, Myzomela obscura
Red myzomela, Myzomela cruentata
Papuan black myzomela, Myzomela nigrita
Alor myzomela, Myzomela prawiradilagae
Crimson-hooded myzomela, Myzomela kuehni
Red-headed myzomela, Myzomela erythrocephala
Sumba myzomela, Myzomela dammermani
Rote myzomela, Myzomela irianawidodoae
Elfin myzomela, Myzomela adolphinae
Sulawesi myzomela, Myzomela chloroptera
Taliabu myzomela, Myzomela wahe
Wakolo myzomela, Myzomela wakoloensis
Banda myzomela, Myzomela boiei
Sclater's myzomela, Myzomela sclateri
Black-breasted myzomela, Myzomela vulnerata
Red-collared myzomela, Myzomela rosenbergii
White-chinned myzomela, Myzomela albigula
Ashy myzomela, Myzomela cineracea
New Ireland myzomela, Myzomela pulchella 
Bismarck black myzomela, Myzomela pammelaena
Scarlet-naped myzomela, Myzomela lafargei
Yellow-vented myzomela, Myzomela eichhorni
Black-bellied myzomela, Myzomela erythromelas
Rotuma myzomela, Myzomela chermesina
Orange-breasted myzomela, Myzomela jugularis
Green-backed honeyeater, Glycichaera fallax
Leaden honeyeater, Ptiloprora plumbea
Yellow-streaked honeyeater, Ptiloprora meekiana
Rufous-sided honeyeater, Ptiloprora erythropleura
Mayr's honeyeater, Ptiloprora mayri
Gray-streaked honeyeater, Ptiloprora perstriata
Rufous-backed honeyeater, Ptiloprora guisei
Sunda honeyeater, Lichmera lombokia
Olive honeyeater, Lichmera argentauris
Brown honeyeater, Lichmera indistincta
White-tufted honeyeater, Lichmera squamata
Silver-eared honeyeater, Lichmera alboauricularis
Buru honeyeater, Lichmera deningeri
Seram honeyeater, Lichmera monticola
Yellow-eared honeyeater, Lichmera flavicans
Black-chested honeyeater, Lichmera notabilis
Blue-faced honeyeater, Entomyzon cyanotis
White-throated honeyeater, Melithreptus albogularis
Tawny-breasted honeyeater, Xanthotis flaviventer
Spotted honeyeater, Xanthotis polygrammus
White-streaked friarbird, Melitograis gilolensis
Little friarbird, Philemon citreogularis
Meyer's friarbird, Philemon meyeri
Timor friarbird, Philemon inornatus
Gray friarbird, Philemon kisserensis
Brass's friarbird, Philemon brassi
Dusky friarbird, Philemon fuscicapillus
Buru friarbird, Philemon moluccensis
Tanimbar friarbird, Philemon plumigenis
Seram friarbird, Philemon subcorniculatus
Helmeted friarbird, Philemon buceroides
Noisy friarbird, Philemon corniculatus
Silver-crowned friarbird, Philemon argenticeps
New Ireland friarbird, Philemon eichhorni
White-naped friarbird, Philemon albitorques
New Britain friarbird, Philemon cockerelli
Kadavu honeyeater, Meliphacator provocator
Chattering giant-honeyeater, Gymnomyza viridis
Duetting giant-honeyeater, Gymnomyza brunneirostris
Western wattled-honeyeater, Foulehaio procerior
Eastern wattled-honeyeater, Foulehaio carunculatus
Northern wattled-honeyeater, Foulehaio taviuensis

Thornbills and alliesOrder: PasseriformesFamily: Acanthizidae

The Acanthizidae are small- to medium-sized birds with short rounded wings, slender bills, long legs, and a short tail. The golden-bellied gerygone is the only member of the family found in mainland Asia.

Goldenface, Pachycare flavogriseum
Rusty mouse-warbler, Crateroscelis murina
Bicolored mouse-warbler, Crateroscelis nigrorufa
Mountain mouse-warbler, Crateroscelis robusta
Tropical scrubwren, Sericornis beccarii
Large scrubwren, Sericornis nouhuysi
Vogelkop scrubwren, Sericornis rufescens
Buff-faced scrubwren, Sericornis perspicillatus
Papuan scrubwren, Sericornis papuensis
Gray-green scrubwren, Sericornis arfakianus
Pale-billed scrubwren, Sericornis spilodera
Papuan thornbill, Acanthiza murina
Gray thornbill, Acanthiza cinerea
Green-backed gerygone, Gerygone chloronota
Fairy gerygone, Gerygone palpebrosa
Biak gerygone, Gerygone hypoxantha
White-throated gerygone, Gerygone olivacea
Yellow-bellied gerygone, Gerygone chrysogaster
Large-billed gerygone, Gerygone magnirostris
Golden-bellied gerygone, Gerygone sulphurea
Plain gerygone, Gerygone inornata
Rufous-sided gerygone, Gerygone dorsalis
Brown-breasted gerygone, Gerygone ruficollis
Mangrove gerygone, Gerygone levigaster
Western gerygone, Gerygone fusca

Pseudo-babblersOrder: PasseriformesFamily: Pomatostomidae

The pseudo-babblers are small to medium-sized birds endemic to Australia and New Guinea. They are ground-feeding omnivores and highly social.

 Papuan babbler, Pomatostomus isidorei
 Gray-crowned babbler, Pomatostomus temporalis

LogrunnersOrder: PasseriformesFamily: Orthonychidae

The Orthonychidae is a family of birds with a single genus, Orthonyx, which comprises two types of passerine birds endemic to Australia and New Guinea, the logrunners and the chowchilla. Both use stiffened tails to brace themselves when feeding.

 Papuan logrunner, Orthonyx novaeguineae

Quail-thrushes and jewel-babblersOrder: PasseriformesFamily: Cinclosomatidae

The Cinclosomatidae is a family containing jewel-babblers and quail-thrushes.

 Painted quail-thrush, Cinclosoma ajax
 Spotted jewel-babbler, Ptilorrhoa leucosticta 
 Blue jewel-babbler, Ptilorrhoa caerulescens 
 Chestnut-backed jewel-babbler, Ptilorrhoa castanonota
 Dimorphic jewel-babbler, Ptilorrhoa geislerorum

CuckooshrikesOrder: PasseriformesFamily: Campephagidae

The cuckooshrikes are small to medium-sized passerine birds. They are predominantly greyish with white and black, although some minivet species are brightly coloured.

White-bellied minivet, Pericrocotus erythropygius
Jerdon's minivet, Pericrocotus albifrons
Fiery minivet, Pericrocotus igneus
Small minivet, Pericrocotus cinnamomeus
Gray-chinned minivet, Pericrocotus solaris
Sunda minivet, Pericrocotus miniatus
Short-billed minivet, Pericrocotus brevirostris
Flores minivet, Pericrocotus lansbergei
Long-tailed minivet, Pericrocotus ethologus
Orange minivet, Pericrocotus flammeus
Scarlet minivet, Pericrocotus speciosus
Ryukyu minivet, Pericrocotus tegimae
Ashy minivet, Pericrocotus divaricatus
Brown-rumped minivet, Pericrocotus cantonensis
Rosy minivet, Pericrocotus roseus
Stout-billed cuckooshrike, Coracina caeruleogrisea
Hooded cuckooshrike, Coracina longicauda
Pied cuckooshrike, Coracina bicolor
Cerulean cuckooshrike, Coracina temminckii
Barred cuckooshrike, Coracina lineata
Boyer's cuckooshrike, Coracina boyeri
Black-faced cuckooshrike, Coracina novaehollandiae
White-bellied cuckooshrike, Coracina papuensis
Moluccan cuckooshrike, Coracina atriceps
Large cuckooshrike, Coracina macei
Bar-bellied cuckooshrike, Coracina striata
Andaman cuckooshrike, Coracina dobsoni
Sunda cuckooshrike, Coracina larvata
Javan cuckooshrike, Coracina javensis
Wallacean cuckooshrike, Coracina personata
Buru cuckooshrike, Coracina fortis
White-rumped cuckooshrike, Coracina leucopygia
Slaty cuckooshrike, Coracina schistacea
Golden cuckooshrike, Coracina sloetii
McGregor's cuckooshrike, Coracina mcgregori
White-shouldered triller, Lalage sueurii
Black-browed triller, Lalage atrovirens
White-browed triller, Lalage moesta
Varied triller, Lalage leucomela
Black-and-white triller, Lalage melanoleuca
White-rumped triller, Lalage leucopygialis
Pied triller, Lalage nigra
Rufous-bellied triller, Lalage aurea
Black-winged cuckooshrike, Lalage melaschistos
Black-headed cuckooshrike, Lalage melanoptera
Lesser cuckooshrike, Lalage fimbriata
Indochinese cuckooshrike, Lalage polioptera
Polynesian triller, Lalage maculosa
Pygmy cuckooshrike, Celebesia abbotti
Halmahera cuckooshrike, Celebesia parvula
Blackish cuckooshrike, Analisoma coerulescens
White-winged cuckooshrike, Analisoma ostenta
Black-bellied cicadabird, Edolisoma montanum
Pale cicadabird, Edolisoma ceramense
Kai cicadabird, Edolisoma dispar
Pale-shouldered cicadabird, Edolisoma dohertyi
Black-bibbed cicadabird, Edolisoma mindanense
Papuan cicadabird, Edolisoma incertum
Sulawesi cicadabird, Edolisoma morio
Sula cicadabird, Edolisoma sula
Common cicadabird, Edolisoma tenuirostre
Gray-headed cicadabird, Edolisoma schisticeps
Black cicadabird, Edolisoma melas

SittellasOrder: PasseriformesFamily: Neosittidae

The sittellas are a family of small passerine birds. They resemble treecreepers, but have soft tails.

 Black sittella, Daphoenositta miranda 
 Papuan sittella, Daphoenositta papuensis
 Varied sittella, Daphoenositta chrysoptera

Whipbirds and wedgebillsOrder: PasseriformesFamily: Psophodidae

The Psophodidae is a family containing whipbirds and wedgebills.

 Papuan whipbird, Androphobus viridis

PloughbillOrder: PasseriformesFamily: Eulacestomidae

The wattled ploughbill was long thought to be related to the whistlers (Pachycephalidae), and shriketits (formerly Pachycephalidae, now often treated as its own family).

 Wattled ploughbill, Eulacestoma nigropectus

Australo-Papuan bellbirdsOrder: PasseriformesFamily: Oreoicidae

The three species contained in the family have been moved around between different families for fifty years. A series of studies of the DNA of Australian birds between 2006 and 2001 found strong support for treating the three genera as a new family, which was formally named in 2016.

 Rufous-naped bellbird, Aleadryas rufinucha 
 Piping bellbird, Ornorectes cristatus

Tit berrypecker and crested berrypeckerOrder: PasseriformesFamily: Paramythiidae

Paramythiidae is a very small bird family restricted to the mountain forests of New Guinea. The two species are colourful medium-sized birds which feed on fruit and some insects.

 Tit berrypecker, Oreocharis arfaki 
 Crested berrypecker, Paramythia montium

Vireos, shrike-babblers, and erpornisOrder: PasseriformesFamily: Vireonidae

Most of the members of this family are found in the New World. However, the shrike-babblers and erpornis, which only slightly resemble the "true" vireos and greenlets, are found in South East Asia.

Black-headed shrike-babbler, Pteruthius rufiventer
Pied shrike-babbler, Pteruthius flaviscapis
White-browed shrike-babbler, Pteruthius aeralatus
Green shrike-babbler, Pteruthius xanthochlorus
Black-eared shrike-babbler, Pteruthius melanotis
Trilling shrike-babbler, Pteruthius aenobarbus
Clicking shrike-babbler, Pteruthius intermedius
White-bellied erpornis, Erpornis zantholeuca

Whistlers and alliesOrder: PasseriformesFamily: Pachycephalidae

The family Pachycephalidae includes the whistlers, shrikethrushes, and some of the pitohuis.

Rusty pitohui, Pseudorectes ferrugineus
White-bellied pitohui, Pseudorectes incertus
Gray shrikethrush, Colluricincla harmonica
Sooty shrikethrush, Colluricincla tenebrosa
Waigeo shrikethrush, Colluricincla affinis
Mamberamo shrikethrush, Colluricincla obscura
Arafura shrikethrush, Colluricincla megarhyncha
Rufous shrikethrush, Colluricincla rufogaster
Black pitohui, Melanorectes nigrescens
Sangihe whistler, Coracornis sanghirensis
Maroon-backed whistler, Coracornis raveni
Bare-throated whistler, Pachycephala nudigula
Fawn-breasted whistler, Pachycephala orpheus
Regent whistler, Pachycephala schlegelii
Vogelkop whistler, Pachycephala meyeri
Sclater's whistler, Pachycephala soror
Rusty-breasted whistler, Pachycephala fulvotincta
Yellow-throated whistler, Pachycephala macrorhyncha
Black-chinned whistler, Pachycephala mentalis
Baliem whistler, Pachycephala balim
Black-tailed whistler, Pachycephala melanura
Morningbird, Pachycephala tenebrosa
Brown-backed whistler, Pachycephala modesta
Lorentz's whistler, Pachycephala lorentzi
Golden-backed whistler, Pachycephala aurea
Yellow-bellied whistler, Pachycephala philippinensis
Bornean whistler, Pachycephala hypoxantha
Sulphur-bellied whistler, Pachycephala sulfuriventer
Mangrove whistler, Pachycephala cinerea
Green-backed whistler, Pachycephala albiventris
White-vented whistler, Pachycephala homeyeri
Island whistler, Pachycephala phaionota
Biak whistler, Pachycephala melanorhyncha
Rusty whistler, Pachycephala hyperythra
Gray whistler, Pachycephala simplex
Wallacean whistler, Pachycephala arctitorquis
Drab whistler, Pachycephala griseonota
White-bellied whistler, Pachycephala leucogastra
Black-headed whistler, Pachycephala monacha
Rufous whistler, Pachycephala rufiventris
Fiji whistler, Pachycephala vitiensis 

Old World oriolesOrder: PasseriformesFamily: Oriolidae

The Old World orioles are colourful passerine birds which are not closely related to the New World orioles.

Hooded pitohui, Pitohui dichrous
Raja Ampat pitohui, Pitohui cerviniventris
Northern variable pitohui, Pitohui kirhocephalus
Southern variable pitohui, Pitohui uropygialis
Timor oriole, Oriolus melanotis
Buru oriole, Oriolus bouroensis
Tanimbar oriole, Oriolus decipiens
Seram oriole, Oriolus forsteni
Halmahera oriole, Oriolus phaeochromus
Brown oriole, Oriolus szalayi
Olive-backed oriole, Oriolus sagittatus
Green oriole, Oriolus flavocinctus
Dark-throated oriole, Oriolus xanthonotus
White-lored oriole, Oriolus albiloris
Philippine oriole, Oriolus steerii
Isabela oriole, Oriolus isabellae
Eurasian golden oriole, Oriolus oriolus
Indian golden oriole, Oriolus kundoo
Black-naped oriole, Oriolus chinensis
Slender-billed oriole, Oriolus tenuirostris
Black-hooded oriole, Oriolus xanthornus
Black oriole, Oriolus hosii
Black-and-crimson oriole, Oriolus cruentus
Maroon oriole, Oriolus traillii
Silver oriole, Oriolus mellianus
Wetar figbird, Sphecotheres hypoleucus
Green figbird, Sphecotheres viridis
Australasian figbird, Sphecotheres vieilloti

BoatbillsOrder: PasseriformesFamily: Machaerirhynchidae

The boatbills have affinities to woodswallows and butcherbirds, and are distributed across New Guinea and northern Queensland.

 Black-breasted boatbill, Machaerirhynchus nigripectus 
 Yellow-breasted boatbill, Machaerirhynchus flaviventer

Woodswallows, bellmagpies and allies Order: PasseriformesFamily: Artamidae

The woodswallows are soft-plumaged, somber-coloured passerine birds. They are smooth, agile flyers with moderately large, semi-triangular wings. The cracticids: currawongs, bellmagpies and butcherbirds, are similar to the other corvids. They have large, straight bills and mostly black, white or grey plumage. All are omnivorous to some degree.

Ashy woodswallow, Artamus fuscus
Ivory-backed woodswallow, Artamus monachus
Great woodswallow, Artamus maximus
White-breasted woodswallow, Artamus leucorynchus
Black-faced woodswallow, Artamus cinereus
Fiji woodswallow, Artamus mentalis
Mountain peltops, Peltops montanus
Lowland peltops, Peltops blainvillii
Black-backed butcherbird, Cracticus mentalis
Hooded butcherbird, Cracticus cassicus
Tagula butcherbird, Cracticus louisiadensis
Black butcherbird, Cracticus quoyi
Australian magpie, Gymnorhina tibicen

Mottled berryhunterOrder: PasseriformesFamily: Rhagologidae

The mottled berryhunter or mottled whistler (Rhagologus leucostigma) is a species of bird whose relationships are unclear but most likely related to the woodswallows, boatbills and butcherbirds.

 Mottled berryhunter, Rhagologus leucostigma

Vangas, helmetshrikes, and alliesOrder: PasseriformesFamily: Vangidae

The family Vangidae is highly variable, though most members of it resemble true shrikes to some degree.

 Malabar woodshrike, Tephrodornis sylvicola 
 Large woodshrike, Tephrodornis gularis 
 Common woodshrike, Tephrodornis pondicerianus 
 Sri Lanka woodshrike, Tephrodornis affinis 
 Bar-winged flycatcher-shrike, Hemipus picatus
 Black-winged flycatcher-shrike, Hemipus hirundinaceus 
 Rufous-winged philentoma, Philentoma pyrhoptera 
 Maroon-breasted philentoma, Philentoma velata

IorasOrder: PasseriformesFamily: Aegithinidae

The ioras are bulbul-like birds of open forest or thorn scrub, but whereas that group tends to be drab in colouration, ioras are sexually dimorphic, with the males being brightly plumaged in yellows and greens.

Common iora, Aegithina tiphia
White-tailed iora, Aegithina nigrolutea
Green iora, Aegithina viridissima
Great iora, Aegithina lafresnayei

BristleheadOrder: PasseriformesFamily: Pityriasidae

The Bornean bristlehead (Pityriasis gymnocephala), also variously known as the bristled shrike, bald-headed crow or the bald-headed wood-shrike, is the only member of the passerine family Pityriasidae and genus Pityriasis. It is an enigmatic and uncommon species of the rainforest canopy of the island of Borneo, to which it is endemic.

Bornean bristlehead, Pityriasis gymnocephala

Bushshrikes and alliesOrder: PasseriformesFamily: Malaconotidae

Bushshrikes are similar in habits to shrikes, hunting insects and other small prey from a perch on a bush. Although similar in build to the shrikes, these tend to be either colourful species or largely black; some species are quite secretive.

Black-crowned tchagra, Tchagra senegalus
Rosy-patched bushshrike, Rhodophoneus cruentus

FantailsOrder: PasseriformesFamily: Rhipiduridae

The fantails are small insectivorous birds with longish, frequently fanned, tails.

Drongo fantail, Chaetorhynchus papuensis
Cerulean flycatcher, Eutrichomyias rowleyi
Black fantail, Rhipidura atra
Black-and-cinnamon fantail, Rhipidura nigrocinnamomea
Mindanao blue-fantail, Rhipidura superciliaris
Visayan blue-fantail, Rhipidura samarensis
Tablas fantail, Rhipidura sauli
Visayan fantail, Rhipidura albiventris
Blue-headed fantail, Rhipidura cyaniceps
Spotted fantail, Rhipidura perlata
Cinnamon-tailed fantail, Rhipidura fuscorufa
Northern fantail, Rhipidura rufiventris
Brown-capped fantail, Rhipidura diluta
Sooty thicket-fantail, Rhipidura threnothorax
Black thicket-fantail, Rhipidura maculipectus
White-bellied thicket-fantail, Rhipidura leucothorax
Willie-wagtail, Rhipidura leucophrys
Malaysian pied-fantail, Rhipidura javanica
Philippine pied-fantail, Rhipidura nigritorquis
White-throated fantail, Rhipidura albicollis
Spot-breasted fantail, Rhipidura albogularis
Rufous-tailed fantail, Rhipidura phoenicura
White-bellied fantail, Rhipidura euryura
White-browed fantail, Rhipidura aureola
Rufous-backed fantail, Rhipidura rufidorsa
Dimorphic fantail, Rhipidura brachyrhyncha
Sulawesi fantail, Rhipidura teysmanni
Peleng fantail, Rhipidura habibiei
Taliabu fantail, Rhipidura sulaensis
Tawny-backed fantail, Rhipidura superflua
Streak-breasted fantail, Rhipidura dedemi
Long-tailed fantail, Rhipidura opistherythra
Rufous fantail, Rhipidura rufifrons
Arafura fantail, Rhipidura dryas
Friendly fantail, Rhipidura albolimbata
Chestnut-bellied fantail, Rhipidura hyperythra
Mangrove fantail, Rhipidura phasiana
Streaked fantail, Rhipidura verreauxi 
Kadavu fantail, Rhiphidura personata
Peleng fantail, Rhiphidura habibiei
Taveuni silktail, Lamprolia victoriale 
Natewa silktail, Lamprolia klinesmithi

DrongosOrder: PasseriformesFamily: Dicruridae

The drongos are mostly black or dark grey in colour, sometimes with metallic tints. They have long forked tails, and some Asian species have elaborate tail decorations. They have short legs and sit very upright when perched, like a shrike. They flycatch or take prey from the ground.

Black drongo, Dicrurus macrocercus
Ashy drongo, Dicrurus leucophaeus
White-bellied drongo, Dicrurus caerulescens
Crow-billed drongo, Dicrurus annectens
Bronzed drongo, Dicrurus aeneus
Lesser racket-tailed drongo, Dicrurus remifer
Hair-crested drongo, Dicrurus hottentottus
Balicassiao, Dicrurus balicassius
Sulawesi drongo, Dicrurus montanus
Sumatran drongo, Dicrurus sumatranus
Wallacean drongo, Dicrurus densus
Spangled drongo, Dicrurus bracteatus
Tablas drongo, Dicrurus menagei
Andaman drongo, Dicrurus andamanensis
Greater racket-tailed drongo, Dicrurus paradiseus
Sri Lanka drongo, Dicrurus lophorinus

Birds-of-paradiseOrder: PasseriformesFamily: Paradisaeidae

The birds-of-paradise are best known for the striking plumage possessed by the males of most species, in particular highly elongated and elaborate feathers extending from the tail, wings or head. These plumes are used in courtship displays to attract females.

 Paradise-crow, Lycocorax pyrrhopterus (E)
 Trumpet manucode, Phonygammus keraudrenii 
 Curl-crested manucode, Manucodia comrii 
 Crinkle-collared manucode, Manucodia chalybatus 
 Jobi manucode, Manucodia jobiensis 
 Glossy-mantled manucode, Manucodia ater
 King-of-Saxony bird-of-paradise, Pteridophora alberti 
 Carola's parotia, Parotia carolae
 Bronze parotia, Parotia berlepschi (A)
 Western parotia, Parotia sefilata
 Wahnes's parotia, Parotia wahnesi 
 Lawes's parotia, Parotia lawesii 
 Twelve-wired bird-of-paradise, Seleucidis melanoleucus 
 Black-billed sicklebill, Drepanornis albertisi 
 Pale-billed sicklebill, Drepanornis bruijnii 
 Standardwing bird-of-paradise, Semioptera wallacii 
 Vogelkop lophorina, Lophorina niedda 
 Greater lophorina, Lophorina superba 
 Magnificent riflebird, Ptiloris magnificus 
 Growling riflebird, Ptiloris intercedens 
 Black sicklebill, Epimachus fastuosus 
 Brown sicklebill, Epimachus meyeri 
 Long-tailed paradigalla, Paradigalla carunculata 
 Short-tailed paradigalla, Paradigalla brevicauda 
 Splendid astrapia, Astrapia splendidissima
 Arfak astrapia, Astrapia nigra
 Huon astrapia, Astrapia rothschildi
 Ribbon-tailed astrapia, Astrapia mayeri 
Stephanie's astrapia, Astrapia stephaniae
 King bird-of-paradise, Cicinnurus regius
 Wilson's bird-of-paradise, Cicinnurus respublica 
 Magnificent bird-of-paradise, Cicinnurus magnificus
 Blue bird-of-paradise, Cicinnurus rudolphi
 Emperor bird-of-paradise, Cicinnurus guilielmi
 Red bird-of-paradise, Paradisaea rubra
 Goldie's bird-of-paradise, Paradisaea decora
 Lesser bird-of-paradise, Paradisaea minor 
 Greater bird-of-paradise, Paradisaea apoda 
 Raggiana bird-of-paradise, Paradisaea raggiana

IfritaOrder: PasseriformesFamily: Ifritidae

The ifritas are a small and insectivorous passerine currently placed in the monotypic family, Ifritidae. Previously, the ifrit has been placed in a plethora of families including Cinclosomatidae or Monarchidae. They are considered an ancient relic species endemic to New Guinea.

 Blue-capped ifrita, Ifrita kowaldi

Monarch flycatchersOrder: PasseriformesFamily: Monarchidae

The monarch flycatchers are small to medium-sized insectivorous passerines which hunt by gleaning, hovering or flycatching.

Short-crested monarch, Hypothymis helenae
Black-naped monarch, Hypothymis azurea
Pale-blue monarch, Hypothymis puella
Celestial monarch, Hypothymis coelestis
Blue paradise-flycatcher, Terpsiphone cyanescens
Rufous paradise-flycatcher, Terpsiphone cinnamomea
Japanese paradise-flycatcher, Terpsiphone atrocaudata
Amur paradise-flycatcher, Terpsiphone incei
Blyth's paradise-flycatcher, Terpsiphone affinis
Indian paradise-flycatcher, Terpsiphone paradisi
African paradise-flycatcher, Terpsiphone viridis
White-naped monarch, Carterornis pileatus 
Loetoe monarch, Carterornis castus
Golden monarch, Carterornis chrysomela
Island monarch, Monarcha cinerascens
Black-faced monarch, Monarcha melanopsis
Black-winged monarch, Monarcha frater
Fan-tailed monarch, Symposiachrus axillaris
Rufous monarch, Monarcha rubiensis
Flores monarch, Symposiachrus sacerdotum
Black-chinned monarch, Symposiachrus boanensis
Spectacled monarch, Symposiachrus trivirgatus
White-tailed monarch, Symposiachrus leucurus
White-tipped monarch, Symposiachrus everetti 
Black-tipped monarch, Symposiachrus loricatus
Kofiau monarch, Symposiachrus julianae
Biak monarch, Symposiachrus brehmii
Hooded monarch, Symposiachrus manadensis
Black-bibbed monarch, Symposiachrus mundus
Spot-winged monarch, Symposiachrus guttula 
Frilled monarch, Arses telescopthalmus
Ochre-collared monarch, Arses insularis
Magpie-lark, Grallina cyanoleuca
Torrent-lark, Grallina bruijnii
Biak flycatcher, Myiagra atra
Moluccan flycatcher, Myiagra galeata
Leaden flycatcher, Myiagra rubecula
Broad-billed flycatcher, Myiagra ruficollis
Satin flycatcher, Myiagra cyanoleuca
Restless flycatcher, Myiagra inquieta (A)
Paperbark flycatcher, Myiagra nana
Shining flycatcher, Myiagra alecto
Vanikoro flycatcher, Myiagra vanikorensis
Azure-crested flycatcher, Myiagra azureocapilla
Chestnut-throated flycatcher, Myiagra castaneigularis
Ogea monarch, Mayrornis versicolor
Slaty monarch, Mayrornis lessoni
Fiji shrikebill, Clytorhynchus vitiensis
Black-throated shrikebill, Clytorhynchus nigrogularis

MelampittasOrder: PasseriformesFamily: Melampittidae

They are little studied and before being established as a family in 2014 their taxonomic relationships with other birds were uncertain, being considered at one time related variously to the pittas, Old World babblers and birds-of-paradise.

 Lesser melampitta, Melampitta lugubris
 Greater melampitta, Melampitta gigantea

Crested shrikejayOrder: PasseriformesFamily: Platylophidae

Until 2018 this species was included in family Corvidae, but genetic and morphological evidence place it in its own family.

Crested shrikejay, Platylophus galericulatus

ShrikesOrder: PasseriformesFamily: Laniidae

Shrikes are passerine birds known for the habit of some species of catching other birds and small animals and impaling the uneaten portions of their bodies on thorns. A shrike's beak is hooked, like that of a typical bird of prey.

Tiger shrike, Lanius tigrinus
Bull-headed shrike, Lanius bucephalus
Red-backed shrike, Lanius collurio
Red-tailed shrike, Lanius phoenicuroides
Isabelline shrike, Lanius isabellinus
Brown shrike, Lanius cristatus
Burmese shrike, Lanius collurioides
Bay-backed shrike, Lanius vittatus
Long-tailed shrike, Lanius schach
Gray-backed shrike, Lanius tephronotus
Mountain shrike, Lanius validirostris
Northern shrike, Lanius borealis
Great gray shrike, Lanius excubitor
Lesser gray shrike, Lanius minor
Chinese gray shrike, Lanius sphenocercus
Giant shrike, Lanius giganteus
Masked shrike, Lanius nubicus
Woodchat shrike, Lanius senator
Iberian gray shrike, Lanius meridionalis 

Crows, jays, and magpiesOrder: PasseriformesFamily: Corvidae

The family Corvidae includes crows, ravens, jays, choughs, magpies, treepies, nutcrackers, and ground jays. Corvids are above average in size among the Passeriformes, and some of the larger species show high levels of intelligence.

Black magpie, Platysmurus leucopterus
Siberian jay, Perisoreus infaustus
Sichuan jay, Perisoreus internigrans
Eurasian jay, Garrulus glandarius
Black-headed jay, Garrulus lanceolatus
Lidth's jay, Garrulus lidthi
Azure-winged magpie, Cyanopica cyanus
Sri Lanka blue-magpie, Urocissa ornata
Taiwan blue-magpie, Urocissa caerulea
Yellow-billed blue-magpie, Urocissa flavirostris
Red-billed blue-magpie, Urocissa erythrorhyncha
White-winged magpie, Urocissa whiteheadi
Common green-magpie, Cissa chinensis
Indochinese green-magpie, Cissa hypoleuca
Javan green-magpie, Cissa thalassina
Bornean green-magpie, Cissa jefferyi
Rufous treepie, Dendrocitta vagabunda
Gray treepie, Dendrocitta formosae
Sumatran treepie, Dendrocitta occipitalis
Bornean treepie, Dendrocitta cinerascens
White-bellied treepie, Dendrocitta leucogastra
Collared treepie, Dendrocitta frontalis
Andaman treepie, Dendrocitta bayleyii
Racket-tailed treepie, Crypsirina temia
Hooded treepie, Crypsirina cucullata
Ratchet-tailed treepie, Temnurus temnurus
Black-rumped magpie, Pica bottanensis
Oriental magpie, Pica serica
Eurasian magpie, Pica pica
Asir magpie, Pica asirensis
Mongolian ground-jay, Podoces hendersoni
Xinjiang ground-jay, Podoces biddulphi
Turkestan ground-jay, Podoces panderi
Iranian ground-jay, Podoces pleskei
Eurasian nutcracker, Nucifraga caryocatactes
Kashmir nutcracker, Nucifraga multipunctata
Red-billed chough, Pyrrhocorax pyrrhocorax
Yellow-billed chough, Pyrrhocorax graculus
Eurasian jackdaw, Corvus monedula
Daurian jackdaw, Corvus dauuricus
House crow, Corvus splendens
Banggai crow, Corvus unicolor
Slender-billed crow, Corvus enca
Violet crow, Corvus violaceus
Piping crow, Corvus typicus
Flores crow, Corvus florensis
Long-billed crow, Corvus validus
Brown-headed crow, Corvus fuscicapillus
Gray crow, Corvus tristis
Rook, Corvus frugilegus
Carrion crow, Corvus corone
Hooded crow, Corvus cornix
Large-billed crow, Corvus macrorhynchos
Torresian crow, Corvus orru
Collared crow, Corvus torquatus
Pied crow, Corvus albus (A) 
Brown-necked raven, Corvus ruficollis
Fan-tailed raven, Corvus rhipidurus
Common raven, Corvus corax
White-necked raven, Corvus albicollis
Plush-crested jay, Cyanocorax chrysops

SatinbirdsOrder: PasseriformesFamily: Cnemophilidae

They are a family of passerine birds which consists of four species found in the mountain forests of New Guinea. They were originally thought to be part of the birds-of-paradise family Paradisaeidae until genetic research suggested that the birds are not closely related to birds-of-paradise at all and are perhaps closer to berry peckers and longbills (Melanocharitidae). The current evidence suggests that their closest relatives may be the cuckoo-shrikes (Campephagidae).

 Loria's satinbird, Cnemophilus loriae 
 Crested satinbird, Cnemophilus macgregorii
 Yellow-breasted satinbird, Loboparadisea sericea

Berrypeckers and longbillsOrder: PasseriformesFamily: Melanocharitidae

The Melanocharitidae are medium-sized birds which feed on fruit and some insects and other invertebrates. They have drab plumage in greys, browns or black and white. The berrypeckers resemble stout short-billed honeyeaters, and the longbills are like drab sunbirds.

 Obscure berrypecker, Melanocharis arfakiana 
 Black berrypecker, Melanocharis nigra 
 Mid-mountain berrypecker, Melanocharis longicauda 
 Fan-tailed berrypecker, Melanocharis versteri 
 Satin berrypecker, Melanocharis citreola
 Streaked berrypecker, Melanocharis striativentris 
 Spotted berrypecker, Melanocharis crassirostris 
 Yellow-bellied longbill, Toxorhamphus novaeguineae 
 Slaty-chinned longbill, Toxorhamphus poliopterus 
 Spectacled longbill, Oedistoma iliolophus 
 Pygmy longbill, Oedistoma pygmaeum

Australasian robinsOrder: PasseriformesFamily: Petroicidae

Most species of Petroicidae have a stocky build with a large rounded head, a short straight bill and rounded wingtips. They occupy a wide range of wooded habitats, from subalpine to tropical rainforest, and mangrove swamp to semi-arid scrubland. All are primarily insectivores, although a few supplement their diet with seeds.

 Greater ground-robin, Amalocichla sclateriana
 Lesser ground-robin, Amalocichla incerta
 Torrent flycatcher, Monachella muelleriana 
 Jacky-winter, Microeca fascinans 
 Golden-bellied flyrobin, Microeca hemixantha
 Lemon-bellied flycatcher, Microeca flavigaster 
 Yellow-legged flycatcher, Microeca griseoceps 
 Olive flyrobin, Microeca flavovirescens 
 Papuan flycatcher, Microeca papuana 
 Garnet robin, Eugerygone rubra
 Subalpine robin, Petroica bivittata 
 Snow Mountain robin, Petroica archboldi (E)
 Pacific robin, Petrocia pusilla
 White-faced robin, Tregellasia leucops 
 Mangrove robin, Eopsaltria pulverulenta
 Black-chinned robin, Poecilodryas brachyura 
 Black-sided robin, Poecilodryas hypoleuca 
 Olive-yellow robin, Poecilodryas placens 
 Black-throated robin, Poecilodryas albonotata 
 White-winged robin, Peneothello sigillata 
 Smoky robin, Peneothello cryptoleuca (E)
 White-rumped robin, Peneothello bimaculata
 Blue-gray robin, Peneothello cyanus 
 Ashy robin, Heteromyias albispecularis 
 Green-backed robin, Pachycephalopsis hattamensis 
 White-eyed robin, Pachycephalopsis poliosoma 
 Papuan scrub-robin, Drymodes beccarii 

Rail-babblerOrder: PasseriformesFamily: Eupetidae

The Malaysian rail-babbler is a rail-like passerine bird which inhabits the floor of primary forest in the Malay Peninsula and Sumatra. It is the only member of its family.

Malaysian rail-babbler, Eupetes macrocerus

Fairy flycatchersOrder: PasseriformesFamily: Stenostiridae

Most of the species of this small family are found in Africa, though a few inhabit tropical Asia. They are not closely related to other birds called "flycatchers".

Yellow-bellied fairy-fantail, Chelidorhynx hypoxanthus
Gray-headed canary-flycatcher, Culicicapa ceylonensis
Citrine canary-flycatcher, Culicicapa helianthea

Tits, chickadees, and titmiceOrder: PasseriformesFamily: Paridae

The Paridae are mainly small stocky woodland species with short stout bills. Some have crests. They are adaptable birds, with a mixed diet including seeds and insects.

Fire-capped tit, Cephalopyrus flammiceps
Yellow-browed tit, Sylviparus modestus
Sultan tit, Melanochlora sultanea
Coal tit, Periparus ater
Rufous-naped tit, Periparus rufonuchalis
Rufous-vented tit, Periparus rubidiventris
Yellow-bellied tit, Periparus venustulus
Elegant tit, Periparus elegans
Palawan tit, Periparus amabilis
Crested tit, Lophophanes cristatus
Gray-crested tit, Lophophanes dichrous
Chestnut-bellied tit, Sittiparus castaneoventris
Iriomote tit, Sittiparus olivaceus
Varied tit, Sittiparus varius
Owston's tit, Sittiparus owstoni
White-fronted tit, Sittiparus semilarvatus
White-browed tit, Poecile superciliosa
Sombre tit, Poecile lugubris
Pere David's tit, Poecile davidi
Marsh tit, Poecile palustris
Black-bibbed tit, Poecile hypermelaenus
Willow tit, Poecile montana
Sichuan tit, Poecile weigoldicus
Gray-headed chickadee, Poecile cinctus
Caspian tit, Poecile hyrcanus
Eurasian blue tit, Cyanistes caeruleus
Azure tit, Cyanistes cyanus
African blue tit, Cyanistes teneriffae
Ground tit, Pseudopodoces humilis
Green-backed tit, Parus monticolus
Great tit, Parus major
Cinereous tit, Parus cinereus
Japanese tit, Parus minor
White-naped tit, Machlolophus nuchalis
Taiwan yellow tit, Machlolophus holsti
Himalayan black-lored tit, Machlolophus xanthogenys
Indian yellow tit, Machlolophus aplonotus
Yellow-cheeked tit, Machlolophus spilonotus

Penduline-titsOrder: PasseriformesFamily: Remizidae

The penduline-tits are a group of small passerine birds related to the true tits. They are insectivores.

Eurasian penduline-tit, Remiz pendulinus
Black-headed penduline-tit, Remiz macronyx
White-crowned penduline-tit, Remiz coronatus
Chinese penduline-tit, Remiz consobrinus

LarksOrder: PasseriformesFamily: Alaudidae

Larks are small terrestrial birds with often extravagant songs and display flights. Most larks are fairly dull in appearance. Their food is insects and seeds.

Greater hoopoe-lark, Alaemon alaudipes
Thick-billed lark, Ramphocoris clotbey
Bar-tailed lark, Ammomanes cinctura
Rufous-tailed lark, Ammomanes phoenicura
Desert lark, Ammomanes deserti
Black-crowned sparrow-lark, Eremopterix nigriceps
Ashy-crowned sparrow-lark, Eremopterix griseus
Chestnut-headed sparrow-lark, Eremopterix signatus
Horsfield’s bushlark, Mirafra javanica
Burmese bushlark, Mirafra microptera
Bengal bushlark, Mirafra assamica
Indochinese bushlark, Mirafra erythrocephala
Jerdon's bushlark, Mirafra affinis
Indian bushlark, Mirafra erythroptera
Kordofan lark, Mirafra cordofanica
Horned lark, Eremophila alpestris
Temminck's lark, Eremophila bilopha
Greater short-toed lark, Calandrella brachydactyla
Mongolian short-toed lark, Calandrella dukhunensis
Hume's short-toed lark, Calandrella acutirostris
Rufous-capped lark, Calandrella eremica
Red-capped lark, Calandrella cinerea
Bimaculated lark, Melanocorypha bimaculata
Calandra lark, Melanocorypha calandra
Tibetan lark, Melanocorypha maxima
Black lark, Melanocorypha yeltoniensis
Mongolian lark, Melanocorypha mongolica
Dunn's lark, Eremalauda dunni (A)
Arabian lark, Eremalauda eremodites
Asian short-toed lark, Alaudala cheleensis
Mediterranean short-toed lark, Alaudala rufescens
Turkestan short-toed lark, Alaudala heinei
Sand lark, Alaudala raytal
Wood lark, Lullula arborea
White-winged lark, Alauda leucoptera
Eurasian skylark, Alauda arvensis
Oriental skylark, Alauda gulgula
Razo skylark, Alauda razae
Crested lark, Galerida cristata
Malabar lark, Galerida malabarica
Tawny lark, Galerida deva
Thekla's lark, Galerida theklae
Dupont's lark, Chersophilus duponti 

Bearded reedlingOrder: PasseriformesFamily: Panuridae

This species, the only one in its family, is found in reed beds throughout temperate Europe and Asia.

Bearded reedling, Panurus biarmicus

Cisticolas and alliesOrder: PasseriformesFamily: Cisticolidae

The Cisticolidae are warblers found mainly in warmer southern regions of the Old World. They are generally very small birds of drab brown or gray appearance found in open country such as grassland or scrub.

Leyte plumed-warbler, Micromacronus leytensis
Mindanao plumed-warbler, Micromacronus sordidus
Common tailorbird, Orthotomus sutorius
Rufous-fronted tailorbird, Orthotomus frontalis
Dark-necked tailorbird, Orthotomus atrogularis
Cambodian tailorbird, Orthotomus chaktomuk
Ashy tailorbird, Orthotomus ruficeps
Olive-backed tailorbird, Orthotomus sepium
Rufous-tailed tailorbird, Orthotomus sericeus
Visayan tailorbird, Orthotomus castaneiceps
Gray-backed tailorbird, Orthotomus derbianus
Green-backed tailorbird, Orthotomus chloronotus
Yellow-breasted tailorbird, Orthotomus samarensis
White-browed tailorbird, Orthotomus nigriceps
White-eared tailorbird, Orthotomus cinereiceps
Himalayan prinia, Prinia crinigera
Striped prinia, Prinia striata
Burmese prinia, Prinia cooki
Annam prinia, Prinia rocki 
Brown prinia, Prinia polychroa
Black-throated prinia, Prinia atrogularis
Hill prinia, Prinia superciliaris
Gray-crowned prinia, Prinia cinereocapilla
Rufescent prinia, Prinia rufescens
Gray-breasted prinia, Prinia hodgsonii
Bar-winged prinia, Prinia familiaris
Graceful prinia, Prinia gracilis
Delicate prinia, Prinia lepida
Jungle prinia, Prinia sylvatica
Yellow-bellied prinia, Prinia flaviventris
Ashy prinia, Prinia socialis
Plain prinia, Prinia inornata
Zitting cisticola, Cisticola juncidis
Golden-headed cisticola, Cisticola exilis
Socotra cisticola, Cisticola haesitatus
Socotra warbler, Incana incana
Cricket longtail, Spiloptila clamans

Reed warblers and alliesOrder: PasseriformesFamily: Acrocephalidae

The members of this family are usually rather large for "warblers". Most are rather plain olivaceous brown above with much yellow to beige below. They are usually found in open woodland, reedbeds, or tall grass. The family occurs mostly in southern to western Eurasia and surroundings, but it also ranges far into the Pacific, with some species in Africa.

Thick-billed warbler, Arundinax aedon
Booted warbler, Iduna caligata
Sykes's warbler, Iduna rama
Eastern olivaceous warbler, Iduna pallida
Western olivaceous warbler, Iduna opaca
Upcher's warbler, Hippolais languida
Olive-tree warbler, Hippolais olivetorum
Icterine warbler, Hippolais icterina
Aquatic warbler, Acrocephalus paludicola
Black-browed reed warbler, Acrocephalus bistrigiceps
Streaked reed warbler, Acrocephalus sorghophilus
Moustached warbler, Acrocephalus melanopogon
Sedge warbler, Acrocephalus schoenobaenus
Paddyfield warbler, Acrocephalus agricola
Blunt-winged warbler, Acrocephalus concinens
Manchurian reed warbler, Acrocephalus tangorum
Blyth's reed warbler, Acrocephalus dumetorum
Large-billed reed warbler, Acrocephalus orinus
Marsh warbler, Acrocephalus palustris
Common reed warbler, Acrocephalus scirpaceus
Basra reed warbler, Acrocephalus griseldis
Great reed warbler, Acrocephalus arundinaceus
Oriental reed warbler, Acrocephalus orientalis
Clamorous reed warbler, Acrocephalus stentoreus
Australian reed warbler, Acrocephalus australis
Cape Verde swamp warbler, Acrocephalus brevipennis

Grassbirds and alliesOrder: PasseriformesFamily: Locustellidae

Locustellidae are a family of small insectivorous songbirds found mainly in Eurasia, Africa, and the Australian region. They are smallish birds with tails that are usually long and pointed, and tend to be drab brownish or buffy all over.

Cordillera ground-warbler, Robsonius rabori
Sierra Madre ground-warbler, Robsonius thompsoni
Bicol ground-warbler, Robsonius sorsogonensis
Fly River grassbird, Poodytes albolimbatus
Little grassbird, Poodytes gramineus
Malia, Malia grata
Buff-banded bushbird, Cincloramphus bivittatus
Tawny grassbird, Cincloramphus timoriensis
Papuan grassbird, Cincloramphus macrurus
Striated grassbird, Megalurus palustris
Broad-tailed grassbird, Schoenicola platyurus
Gray's grasshopper warbler, Helopsaltes fasciolatus
Sakhalin grasshopper warbler, Helopsaltes amnicola
Marsh grassbird, Helopsaltes pryeri
Pallas's grasshopper warbler, Helopsaltes certhiola
Middendorff's grasshopper warbler, Helopsaltes ochotensis
Pleske's grasshopper warbler, Helopsaltes pleskei
Lanceolated warbler, Locustella lanceolata
River warbler, Locustella fluviatilis
Savi's warbler, Locustella luscinioides
Brown bush warbler, Locustella luteoventris
Chinese bush warbler, Locustella tacsanowskia
Long-billed bush warbler, Locustella major
Common grasshopper-warbler, Locustella naevia
Long-tailed bush warbler, Locustella caudata
Sulawesi bush warbler, Locustella castanea
Seram bush warbler, Locustella musculus
Taliabu bush warbler, Locustella portenta
Buru bush warbler, Locustella disturbans
Baikal bush warbler, Locustella davidi
West Himalayan bush warbler, Locustella kashmirensis
Spotted bush warbler, Locustella thoracica
Taiwan bush warbler, Locustella alishanensis
Friendly bush warbler, Locustella accentor
Russet bush warbler, Locustella mandelli
Dalat bush warbler, Locustella idonea
Sichuan bush warbler, Locustella chengi
Benguet bush warbler, Locustella seebohmi
Javan bush warbler, Locustella montis
Sri Lanka bush warbler, Elaphrornis palliseri
Bristled grassbird, Schoenicola striatus
Long-legged thicketbird, Trichocichla rufa

CupwingsOrder: PasseriformesFamily: Pnoepygidae

The members of this small family are found in mountainous parts of South and South East Asia.

Scaly-breasted cupwing, Pnoepyga albiventer
Taiwan cupwing, Pnoepyga formosana
Immaculate cupwing, Pnoepyga immaculata
Pygmy cupwing, Pnoepyga pusilla

SwallowsOrder: PasseriformesFamily: Hirundinidae

The family Hirundinidae is adapted to aerial feeding. They have a slender streamlined body, long pointed wings, and a short bill with a wide gape. The feet are adapted to perching rather than walking, and the front toes are partially joined at the base.

White-eyed river martin, Pseudochelidon sirintarae
Purple martin, Progne subis (A)
Tree swallow, Tachycineta bicolor
Plain martin, Riparia paludicola
Gray-throated martin, Riparia chinensis
Bank swallow, Riparia riparia
Pale sand martin, Riparia diluta
Banded martin, Neophedina cincta
Eurasian crag-martin, Ptyonoprogne rupestris
Rock martin, Ptyonoprogne fuligula
Dusky crag-martin, Ptyonoprogne concolor
Barn swallow, Hirundo rustica
Wire-tailed swallow, Hirundo smithii
Welcome swallow, Hirundo neoxena
Hill swallow, Hirundo domicola
Pacific swallow, Hirundo tahitica
Ethiopian swallow, Hirundo aethiopica
Red-rumped swallow, Cecropis daurica
Sri Lanka swallow, Cecropis hyperythra
Striated swallow, Cecropis striolata
Rufous-bellied swallow, Cecropis badia
Lesser striped swallow, Cercopis abyssinica
Streak-throated swallow, Petrochelidon fluvicola
Fairy martin, Petrochelidon ariel
Tree martin, Petrochelidon nigricans
Cliff swallow, Petrochelidon pyrrhonota
Red Sea cliff swallow, Petrochelidon perdita
Preuss's swallow, Petrochelidon preussi
Common house-martin, Delichon urbicum
Asian house-martin, Delichon dasypus
Nepal house-martin, Delichon nipalense
Northern rough-winged swallow, Stelgidopteryx serripennis

BulbulsOrder: PasseriformesFamily: Pycnonotidae

Bulbuls are medium-sized songbirds. Some are colourful with yellow, red, or orange vents, cheeks, throats, or supercilia, but most are drab, with uniform olive-brown to black plumage. Some species have distinct crests.

Black-and-white bulbul, Brachypodius melanoleucos
Puff-backed bulbul, Brachypodius eutilotus
Yellow-wattled bulbul, Brachypodius urostictus
Gray-headed bulbul, Brachypodius priocephalus
Black-headed bulbul, Brachypodius melanocephalos
Andaman bulbul, Brachypodius fuscoflavescens
Spectacled bulbul, Rubigula erythropthalmos
Gray-bellied bulbul, Rubigula cyaniventris
Scaly-breasted bulbul, Rubigula squamatus
Black-crested bulbul, Rubigula flaviventris
Flame-throated bulbul, Rubigula gularis
Black-capped bulbul, Rubigula melanicterus
Ruby-throated bulbul, Rubigula dispar
Bornean bulbul, Rubigula montis
Bare-faced bulbul, Nok hualon
Crested finchbill, Spizixos canifrons
Collared finchbill, Spizixos semitorques
Straw-headed bulbul, Pycnonotus zeylanicus
Striated bulbul, Pycnonotus striatus
Cream-striped bulbul, Pycnonotus leucogrammicus
Spot-necked bulbul, Pycnonotus tympanistrigus
Styan's bulbul, Pycnonotus taivanus
Red-vented bulbul, Pycnonotus cafer
Red-whiskered bulbul, Pycnonotus jocosus
Brown-breasted bulbul, Pycnonotus xanthorrhous
Light-vented bulbul, Pycnonotus sinensis
Common bulbul, Pycnonotus barbatus
White-spectacled bulbul, Pycnonotus xanthopygos
White-eared bulbul, Pycnonotus leucotis
Himalayan bulbul, Pycnonotus leucogenys
Sooty-headed bulbul, Pycnonotus aurigaster
Blue-wattled bulbul, Pycnonotus nieuwenhuisii
Aceh bulbul, Pycnonotus snouckaerti
Orange-spotted bulbul, Pycnonotus bimaculatus
Stripe-throated bulbul, Pycnonotus finlaysoni
Yellow-throated bulbul, Pycnonotus xantholaemus
Yellow-eared bulbul, Pycnonotus penicillatus
Flavescent bulbul, Pycnonotus flavescens
White-browed bulbul, Pycnonotus luteolus
Yellow-vented bulbul, Pycnonotus goiavier
Olive-winged bulbul, Pycnonotus plumosus
Ashy-fronted bulbul, Pycnonotus cinereifrons
Cream-eyed bulbul, Pycnonotus pseudosimplex
Ayeyarwady bulbul, Pycnonotus blanfordi
Streak-eared bulbul, Pycnonotus conradi
Cream-vented bulbul, Pycnonotus simplex
Red-eyed bulbul, Pycnonotus brunneus
Hairy-backed bulbul, Tricholestes criniger
Hook-billed bulbul, Setornis criniger
Finsch's bulbul, Alophoixus finschii
White-throated bulbul, Alophoixus flaveolus
Puff-throated bulbul, Alophoixus pallidus
Ochraceous bulbul, Alophoixus ochraceus
Penan bulbul, Alophoixus ruficrissus
Gray-cheeked bulbul, Alophoixus tephrogenys
Brown-cheeked bulbul, Alophoixus bres
Gray-throated bulbul, Alophoixus frater
Yellow-bellied bulbul, Alophoixus phaeocephalus
Sangihe golden-bulbul, Alophoixus platenae
Togian golden-bulbul, Alophoixus aureus
Sula golden-bulbul, Alophoixus longirostris
Halmahera golden-bulbul, Alophoixus chloris
Obi golden-bulbul, Alophoixus lucasi
Buru golden-bulbul, Alophoixus mystacalis
Seram golden-bulbul, Alophoixus affinis
Sulphur-bellied bulbul, Ixos palawanensis
Buff-vented bulbul, Iole crypta
Charlotte's bulbul, Iole charlottae
Gray-eyed bulbul, Iole propinqua
Cachar bulbul, Iole cacharensis
Olive bulbul, Iole virescens
Yellow-browed bulbul, Iole indica
Mauritius bulbul, Hypsipetes olivaceus (Ex)
Black bulbul, Hypsipetes leucocephalus
Square-tailed bulbul, Hypsipetes ganeesa
Nicobar bulbul, Hypsipetes nicobariensis
White-headed bulbul, Hypsipetes thompsoni
Brown-eared bulbul, Hypsipetes amaurotis
Visayan bulbul, Hypsipetes guimarasensis
Zamboanga bulbul, Hypsipetes rufigularis
Yellowish bulbul, Hypsipetes everetti
Mindoro bulbul, Hypsipetes mindorensis
Streak-breasted bulbul, Hypsipetes siquijorensis
Philippine bulbul, Hypsipetes philippinus
Ashy bulbul, Hemixos flavala
Cinereous bulbul, Hemixos cinereus
Chestnut bulbul, Hemixos castanonotus
Mountain bulbul, Ixos mcclellandii
Sunda bulbul, Ixos virescens
Streaked bulbul, Ixos malaccensis

Leaf warblersOrder: PasseriformesFamily: Phylloscopidae

Leaf warblers are a family of small insectivorous birds found mostly in Eurasia and ranging into Wallacea and Africa. The species are of various sizes, often green-plumaged above and yellow below, or more subdued with greyish-green to greyish-brown colours.

Wood warbler, Phylloscopus sibilatrix
Eastern Bonelli's warbler, Phylloscopus orientalis
Ashy-throated warbler, Phylloscopus maculipennis
Buff-barred warbler, Phylloscopus pulcher
Yellow-browed warbler, Phylloscopus inornatus
Hume's warbler, Phylloscopus humei
Brooks's leaf warbler, Phylloscopus subviridis
Chinese leaf warbler, Phylloscopus yunnanensis
Pallas's leaf warbler, Phylloscopus proregulus
Gansu leaf warbler, Phylloscopus kansuensis
Lemon-rumped warbler, Phylloscopus chloronotus
Sichuan leaf warbler, Phylloscopus forresti
Tytler's leaf warbler, Phylloscopus tytleri
Radde's warbler, Phylloscopus schwarzi
Yellow-streaked warbler, Phylloscopus armandii
Sulphur-bellied warbler, Phylloscopus griseolus
Tickell's leaf warbler, Phylloscopus affinis
Dusky warbler, Phylloscopus fuscatus
Smoky warbler, Phylloscopus fuligiventer
Plain leaf warbler, Phylloscopus neglectus
Buff-throated warbler, Phylloscopus subaffinis
Willow warbler, Phylloscopus trochilus
Mountain chiffchaff, Phylloscopus sindianus
Common chiffchaff, Phylloscopus collybita
Iberian chiffchaff, Phylloscopus ibericus (A)
Lemon-throated leaf warbler, Phylloscopus cebuensis
Philippine leaf warbler, Phylloscopus olivaceus
Eastern crowned leaf warbler, Phylloscopus coronatus
Ijima's leaf warbler, Phylloscopus ijimae
Brown woodland-warbler, Phylloscopus umbrovirens
White-spectacled warbler, Phylloscopus affinis
Gray-cheeked warbler, Phylloscopus poliogenys
Green-crowned warbler, Phylloscopus burkii
Gray-crowned warbler, Phylloscopus tephrocephalus
Whistler's warbler, Phylloscopus whistleri
Bianchi's warbler, Phylloscopus valentini
Martens's warbler, Phylloscopus omeiensis
Alström's warbler, Phylloscopus soror
Green warbler, Phylloscopus nitidus
Greenish warbler, Phylloscopus trochiloides
Two-barred warbler, Phylloscopus plumbeitarsus
Emei leaf warbler, Phylloscopus emeiensis
Large-billed leaf warbler, Phylloscopus magnirostris
Pale-legged leaf warbler, Phylloscopus tenellipes
Sakhalin leaf warbler, Phylloscopus borealoides
Japanese leaf warbler, Phylloscopus xanthodryas
Arctic warbler, Phylloscopus borealis
Kamchatka leaf warbler, Phylloscopus examinandus
Chestnut-crowned warbler, Phylloscopus castaniceps
Yellow-breasted warbler, Phylloscopus montis
Sunda warbler, Phylloscopus grammiceps
Limestone leaf warbler, Phylloscopus calciatilis
Yellow-vented warbler, Phylloscopus cantator
Sulphur-breasted warbler, Phylloscopus ricketti
Western crowned warbler, Phylloscopus occipitalis
Blyth's leaf warbler, Phylloscopus reguloides
Claudia's leaf warbler, Phylloscopus claudiae
Hartert's leaf warbler, Phylloscopus goodsoni
Gray-hooded warbler, Phylloscopus xanthoschistos
Davison's leaf warbler, Phylloscopus intensior
Hainan leaf warbler, Phylloscopus hainanus
Kloss's leaf warbler, Phylloscopus ogilviegranti
Mountain leaf warbler, Phylloscopus trivirgatus
Negros leaf warbler, Phylloscopus nigrorum
Timor leaf warbler, Phylloscopus presbytes
Rote leaf warbler, Phylloscopus rotiensis
Sulawesi leaf warbler, Phylloscopus nesophilus
Lompobattang leaf warbler, Phylloscopus sarasinorum
Numfor leaf warbler, Phylloscopus maforensis
Island leaf warbler, Phylloscopus poliocephalus
Biak leaf warbler, Phylloscopus misoriensis
Canary Islands chiffchaff, Phylloscopus canariensis

Bush warblers and alliesOrder: PasseriformesFamily: Scotocercidae

The members of this family are found throughout Africa, Asia, and Polynesia. Their taxonomy is in flux, and some authorities place some genera in other families.

Scrub warbler, Scotocerca inquieta
Pale-footed bush warbler, Urosphena pallidipes
Timor stubtail, Urosphena subulata
Bornean stubtail, Urosphena whiteheadi
Asian stubtail, Urosphena squameiceps
Gray-bellied tesia, Tesia cyaniventer
Slaty-bellied tesia, Tesia olivea
Javan tesia, Tesia superciliaris
Russet-capped tesia, Tesia everetti
Chestnut-crowned bush warbler, Cettia major
Gray-sided bush warbler, Cettia brunnifrons
Chestnut-headed tesia, Cettia castaneocoronata
Cetti's warbler, Cettia cetti
Yellow-bellied warbler, Abroscopus superciliaris
Rufous-faced warbler, Abroscopus albogularis
Black-faced warbler, Abroscopus schisticeps
Mountain tailorbird, Phyllergates cuculatus
Rufous-headed tailorbird, Phyllergates heterolaemus
Broad-billed warbler, Tickellia hodgsoni
Philippine bush warbler, Horornis seebohmi
Japanese bush warbler, Horornis diphone
Manchurian bush warbler, Horornis borealis (A)
Tanimbar bush warbler, Horornis carolinae
Brownish-flanked bush warbler, Horornis fortipes
Hume's bush warbler, Horornis brunnescens
Yellowish-bellied bush warbler, Horornis acanthizoides
Aberrant bush warbler, Horornis flavolivacea
Fiji bush warbler, Horornis ruficapilla 

Long-tailed titsOrder: PasseriformesFamily: Aegithalidae

Long-tailed tits are a group of small passerine birds with medium to long tails. They make woven bag nests in trees. Most eat a mixed diet which includes insects.

White-browed tit-warbler, Leptopoecile sophiae
Crested tit-warbler, Leptopoecile elegans
Long-tailed tit, Aegithalos caudatus
Silver-throated tit, Aegithalos glaucogularis
White-cheeked tit, Aegithalos leucogenys
Black-throated tit, Aegithalos concinnus
White-throated tit, Aegithalos niveogularis
Black-browed tit, Aegithalos iouschistos
Sooty tit, Aegithalos fuliginosus
Pygmy tit, Psaltria exilis

Sylviid warblers, parrotbills, and alliesOrder: PasseriformesFamily: Sylviidae

The family Sylviidae is a group of small insectivorous passerine birds. They mainly occur as breeding species, as the common name implies, in Europe, Asia and, to a lesser extent, Africa. Most are of generally undistinguished appearance, but many have distinctive songs.

Eurasian blackcap, Sylvia atricapilla
Garden warbler, Sylvia borin
Asian desert warbler, Curruca nana
Barred warbler, Curruca nisoria
Lesser whitethroat, Curruca curruca
Yemen warbler, Curruca buryi
Arabian warbler, Curruca leucomelaena
Eastern Orphean warbler, Curruca crassirostris
Cyprus warbler, Curruca melanothorax
Menetries's warbler, Curruca mystacea
Rüppell's warbler, Curruca ruppeli
Eastern subalpine warbler, Curruca cantillans
Sardinian warbler, Curruca melanocephala
Greater whitethroat, Curruca communis
Western Orphean warbler, Curruca hortensis
Tristram's warbler, Curruca deserticola 
Spectacled warbler, Curruca conspicillata
Marmora's warbler, Curruca sarda 
Dartford warbler, Curruca undata
Moltoni's warbler, Curruca subalpina
Balearic warbler, Curruca balearica
Fire-tailed myzornis, Myzornis pyrrhoura
Golden-breasted fulvetta, Lioparus chrysotis
Yellow-eyed babbler, Chrysomma sinense
Jerdon's babbler, Chrysomma altirostre
Rufous-tailed babbler, Moupinia poecilotis
Spectacled fulvetta, Fulvetta ruficapilla
Indochinese fulvetta, Fulvetta danisi
Chinese fulvetta, Fulvetta striaticollis
Brown-throated fulvetta, Fulvetta ludlowi
White-browed fulvetta, Fulvetta vinipectus
Taiwan fulvetta, Fulvetta formosana
Gray-hooded fulvetta, Fulvetta cinereiceps
Streak-throated fulvetta, Fulvetta manipurensis
Tarim babbler, Rhopophilus albosuperciliaris
Beijing babbler, Rhopophilus pekinensis
Great parrotbill, Conostoma aemodium
Brown parrotbill, Cholornis unicolor
Three-toed parrotbill, Cholornis paradoxus
Gray-headed parrotbill, Psittiparus gularis
Black-headed parrotbill, Psittiparus margaritae
White-breasted parrotbill, Psittiparus ruficeps
Rufous-headed parrotbill, Psittiparus bakeri
Black-breasted parrotbill, Paradoxornis flavirostris
Spot-breasted parrotbill, Paradoxornis guttaticollis
Reed parrotbill, Calamornis heudei
Pale-billed parrotbill, Chleuasicus atrosuperciliaris
Spectacled parrotbill, Sinosuthora conspicillata
Vinous-throated parrotbill, Sinosuthora webbiana
Brown-winged parrotbill, Sinosuthora brunnea
Ashy-throated parrotbill, Sinosuthora alphonsiana
Gray-hooded parrotbill, Sinosuthora zappeyi
Rusty-throated parrotbill, Sinosuthora przewalskii
Fulvous parrotbill, Suthora fulvifrons
Black-throated parrotbill, Suthora nipalensis
Golden parrotbill, Suthora verreauxi
Short-tailed parrotbill, Neosuthora davidiana

White-eyes, yuhinas, and alliesOrder: PasseriformesFamily: Zosteropidae

The white-eyes are small birds of rather drab appearance, the plumage above being typically greenish-olive, but some species have a white or bright yellow throat, breast, or lower parts, and several have buff flanks. As the name suggests, many species have a white ring around each eyes.

White-collared yuhina, Parayuhina diademata
Striated yuhina, Staphida castaniceps
Indochinese yuhina, Staphida torqueola
Chestnut-crested yuhina, Staphida everetti
White-naped yuhina, Yuhina bakeri
Whiskered yuhina, Yuhina flavicollis
Burmese yuhina, Yuhina humilis
Stripe-throated yuhina, Yuhina gularis
Rufous-vented yuhina, Yuhina occipitalis
Taiwan yuhina, Yuhina brunneiceps
Black-chinned yuhina, Yuhina nigrimenta
Chestnut-faced babbler, Zosterornis whiteheadi
Luzon striped-babbler, Zosterornis striatus
Panay striped-babbler, Zosterornis latistriatus
Negros striped-babbler, Zosterornis nigrorum
Palawan striped-babbler, Zosterornis hypogrammicus
Javan gray-throated white-eye, Heleia javanicus
Streak-headed white-eye, Heleia squamiceps
Gray-hooded white-eye, Heleia pinaiae
Mindanao white-eye, Heleia goodfellowi
White-browed white-eye, Heleia superciliaris
Dark-crowned white-eye, Heleia dohertyi
Pygmy white-eye, Heleia squamifrons
Flores white-eye, Heleia crassirostris
Timor white-eye, Heleia muelleri
Yellow-spectacled white-eye, Heleia wallacei
Bonin white-eye, Apalopteron familiare
Rufescent white-eye, Tephrozosterops stalkeri
Golden-crowned babbler, Sterrhoptilus dennistouni
Black-crowned babbler, Sterrhoptilus nigrocapitata
Rusty-crowned babbler, Sterrhoptilus capitalis
Flame-templed babbler, Dasycrotapha speciosa
Visayan pygmy-babbler, Dasycrotapha pygmaea
Mindanao pygmy-babbler, Dasycrotapha plateni
Abyssinian white-eye, Zosterops abyssinicus
Socotra white-eye, Zosterops socotranus
Sri Lanka white-eye, Zosterops ceylonensis
Chestnut-flanked white-eye, Zosterops erythropleurus
Indian white-eye, Zosterops palpebrosus
Hume's white-eye, Zosterops auriventer
Sangkar white-eye, Zosterops melanurus
Warbling white-eye, Zosterops japonicus
Swinhoe's white-eye, Zosterops simplex
Lowland white-eye, Zosterops meyeni
Black-capped white-eye, Zosterops atricapilla
Everett's white-eye, Zosterops everetti
Yellowish white-eye, Zosterops nigrorum
Javan white-eye, Zosterops flavus
Lemon-bellied white-eye, Zosterops chloris
Meratus white-eye, Zosterops meratusensis
Wakatobi white-eye, Zosterops flavissimus
Ashy-bellied white-eye, Zosterops citrinella
Great Kai white-eye, Zosterops grayi
Little Kai white-eye, Zosterops uropygialis
Sulawesi white-eye, Zosterops consobrinorum
Black-ringed white-eye, Zosterops anomalus
Black-crowned white-eye, Zosterops atrifrons
Togian white-eye, Zosterops somadikartai
Sangihe white-eye, Zosterops nehrkorni
Seram white-eye, Zosterops stalkeri
Cream-throated white-eye, Zosterops atriceps
Black-fronted white-eye, Zosterops minor
Tagula white-eye, Zosterops meeki
Biak white-eye, Zosterops mysorensis
Capped white-eye, Zosterops fuscicapilla
Buru white-eye, Zosterops buruensis
Ambon white-eye, Zosterops kuehni
New Guinea white-eye, Zosterops novaeguineae
Louisiade white-eye, Zosterops griseotinctus
Layard's white-eye, Zosterops explorator
Silver eye, Zosterops lateralis
Yellow-fronted white-eye, Zosterops flavifrons
Mountain black-eye, Zosterops emiliae

Tree-babblers, scimitar-babblers, and alliesOrder: PasseriformesFamily''': Timaliidae

The members of this family are somewhat diverse in size and colouration, but are characterised by soft fluffy plumage.

Chestnut-capped babbler, Timalia pileataPin-striped tit-babbler, Mixornis gularisBold-striped tit-babbler, Mixornis bornensisGray-cheeked tit-babbler, Mixornis flavicollisKangean tit-babbler, Mixornis prillwitziGray-faced tit-babbler, Mixornis kelleyiTawny-bellied babbler, Dumetia hyperythraDark-fronted babbler, Dumetia atricepsBrown tit-babbler, Macronus striaticepsFluffy-backed tit-babbler, Macronus ptilosusGolden babbler, Cyanoderma chrysaeumChestnut-winged babbler, Cyanoderma erythropterumGray-hooded babbler, Cyanoderma bicolorCrescent-chested babbler, Cyanoderma melanothoraxBlack-chinned babbler, Cyanoderma pyrrhopsRufous-capped babbler, Cyanoderma ruficepsBuff-chested babbler, Cyanoderma ambiguum'
Rufous-fronted babbler, Cyanoderma rufifrons
Rufous-throated wren-babbler, Spelaeornis caudatus
Mishmi wren-babbler, Spelaeornis badeigularis
Bar-winged wren-babbler, Spelaeornis troglodytoides
Naga wren-babbler, Spelaeornis chocolatinus
Chin Hills wren-babbler, Spelaeornis oatesi
Gray-bellied wren-babbler, Spelaeornis reptatus
Pale-throated wren-babbler, Spelaeornis kinneari
Tawny-breasted wren-babbler, Spelaeornis longicaudatus
Red-billed scimitar-babbler, Pomatorhinus ochraceiceps
Coral-billed scimitar-babbler, Pomatorhinus ferruginosus
Sunda scimitar-babbler, Pomatorhinus bornensis
Javan scimitar-babbler, Pomatorhinus montanus
Slender-billed scimitar-babbler, Pomatorhinus superciliaris
Streak-breasted scimitar-babbler, Pomatorhinus ruficollis
Taiwan scimitar-babbler, Pomatorhinus musicus
Indian scimitar-babbler, Pomatorhinus horsfieldii
Sri Lanka scimitar-babbler, Pomatorhinus melanurus
White-browed scimitar-babbler, Pomatorhinus schisticeps
Large scimitar-babbler, Erythrogenys hypoleucos
Black-necklaced scimitar-babbler, Erythrogenys erythrocnemis
Rusty-cheeked scimitar-babbler, Erythrogenys erythrogenys
Spot-breasted scimitar-babbler, Erythrogenys mcclellandi
Black-streaked scimitar-babbler, Erythrogenys gravivox
Gray-sided scimitar-babbler, Erythrogenys swinhoei
White-breasted babbler, Stachyris grammiceps
Black-throated babbler, Stachyris nigricollis
Chestnut-rumped babbler, Stachyris maculata
Gray-throated babbler, Stachyris nigriceps
Gray-headed babbler, Stachyris poliocephala
White-necked babbler, Stachyris leucotis
White-bibbed babbler, Stachyris thoracica
Snowy-throated babbler, Stachyris oglei
Spot-necked babbler, Stachyris striolata
Sooty babbler, Stachyris herberti
Nonggang babbler, Stachyris nonggangensis
Sikkim wedge-billed babbler, Stachyris humei
Cachar wedge-billed babbler, Stachyris roberti

Ground babblers and allies
Order: PasseriformesFamily: Pellorneidae

These small to medium-sized songbirds have soft fluffy plumage but are otherwise rather diverse. Members of the genus Illadopsis are found in forests, but some other genera are birds of scrublands.

Palawan babbler, Malacopteron palawanense
Moustached babbler, Malacopteron magnirostre
Sooty-capped babbler, Malacopteron affine
Scaly-crowned babbler, Malacopteron cinereum
Rufous-crowned babbler, Malacopteron magnum
Gray-breasted babbler, Malacopteron albogulare
White-hooded babbler, Gampsorhynchus rufulus
Collared babbler, Gampsorhynchus torquatus
Gold-fronted fulvetta, Schoeniparus variegaticeps
Yellow-throated fulvetta, Schoeniparus cinereus
Rufous-winged fulvetta, Schoeniparus castaneceps
Black-crowned fulvetta, Schoeniparus klossi
Rufous-throated fulvetta, Schoeniparus rufogularis
Dusky fulvetta, Schoeniparus brunneus
Rusty-capped fulvetta, Schoeniparus dubius
Rufous-vented grass babbler, Laticilla burnesii
Swamp grass babbler, Laticilla cinerascens
Puff-throated babbler, Pellorneum ruficeps
Black-capped babbler, Pellorneum capistratum
Brown-capped babbler, Pellorneum fuscocapillus
Marsh babbler, Pellorneum palustre
Spot-throated babbler, Pellorneum albiventre
Buff-breasted babbler, Pellorneum tickelli
Sumatran babbler, Pellorneum buettikoferi
Temminck's babbler, Pellorneum pyrrogenys
Short-tailed babbler, Pellorneum malaccense
Ashy-headed babbler, Pellorneum cinereiceps
White-chested babbler, Pellorneum rostratum
Sulawesi babbler, Pellorneum celebense
Ferruginous babbler, Pellorneum bicolor
Striped wren-babbler, Kenopia striata
Eyebrowed wren-babbler, Napothera epilepidota
Short-tailed scimitar-babbler, Napothera danjoui
Naung Mung scimitar-babbler, Napothera naungmungensis
Long-billed wren-babbler, Napothera malacoptila
White-throated wren-babbler, Napothera pasquieri
Sumatran wren-babbler, Napothera albostriata
Bornean wren-babbler, Ptilocichla leucogrammica
Striated wren-babbler, Ptilocichla mindanensis
Falcated wren-babbler, Ptilocichla falcata
Abbott's babbler, Malacocincla abbotti
Horsfield's babbler, Malacocincla sepiaria
Black-browed babbler, Malacocincla perspicillata
Large wren-babbler, Turdinus macrodactylus
Black-throated wren-babbler, Turdinus atrigularis
Marbled wren-babbler, Turdinus marmoratus
Rusty-breasted wren-babbler, Gypsophila rufipectus
Annam limestone babbler, Gypsophila annamensis
Rufous limestone babbler, Gypsophila calcicola
Variable limestone babbler, Gypsophila crispifrons
Streaked wren-babbler, Gypsophila brevicaudatus
Mountain wren-babbler, Gypsophila crassus
Indian grassbird, Graminicola bengalensis
Chinese grassbird, Graminicola striatus

Laughingthrushes and allies
Order: PasseriformesFamily: Leiothrichidae

The members of this family are diverse in size and colouration, though those of genus Turdoides tend to be brown or greyish. The family is found in Africa, India, and southeast Asia.

Brown fulvetta, Alcippe brunneicauda
Brown-cheeked fulvetta, Alcippe poioicephala
Morrison's fulvetta, Alcippe morrisonia
Yunnan fulvetta, Alcippe fratercula
David's fulvetta, Alcippe davidi
Huet's fulvetta, Alcippe hueti
Javan fulvetta, Alcippe pyrrhoptera
Mountain fulvetta, Alcippe peracensis
Nepal fulvetta, Alcippe nipalensis
Black-browed fulvetta, Alcippe grotei
Striated laughingthrush, Grammatoptila striata
Himalayan cutia, Cutia nipalensis
Vietnamese cutia, Cutia legalleni
Spiny babbler, Turdoides nipalensis
Iraq babbler, Argya altirostris
Afghan babbler, Argya huttoni
Common babbler, Argya caudata
Striated babbler, Argya earlei
White-throated babbler, Argya gularis
Slender-billed babbler, Argya longirostris
Large gray babbler, Argya malcolmi
Ashy-headed laughingthrush, Argya cinereifrons
Arabian babbler, Argya squamiceps
Rufous babbler, Argya subrufa
Jungle babbler, Argya striata
Orange-billed babbler, Argya rufescens
Yellow-billed babbler, Argya affinis
Fulvous chatterer, Argya fulva
Sunda laughingthrush, Garrulax palliatus
Rufous-fronted laughingthrush, Garrulax rufifrons
Masked laughingthrush, Garrulax perspicillatus
White-crested laughingthrush, Garrulax leucolophus
Sumatran laughingthrush, Garrulax bicolor
Lesser necklaced laughingthrush, Garrulax monileger
Cambodian laughingthrush, Garrulax ferrarius
White-necked laughingthrush, Garrulax strepitans
Black-hooded laughingthrush, Garrulax milleti
Gray laughingthrush, Garrulax maesi
Rufous-cheeked laughingthrush, Garrulax castanotis
Spot-breasted laughingthrush, Garrulax merulinus
Orange-breasted laughingthrush, Garrulax annamensis
Chinese hwamei, Garrulax canorus
Taiwan hwamei, Garrulax taewanus
Red-tailed laughingthrush, Garrulax milnei
Black laughingthrush, Melanocichla lugubris
Bare-headed laughingthrush, Melanocichla calvus
Snowy-cheeked laughingthrush, Ianthocincla sukatschewi
Moustached laughingthrush, Ianthocincla cineracea
Rufous-chinned laughingthrush, Ianthocincla rufogularis
Chestnut-eared laughingthrush, Ianthocincla konkakinhensis
Spotted laughingthrush, Ianthocincla ocellata
Barred laughingthrush, Ianthocincla lunulata
Biet's laughingthrush, Ianthocincla bieti
Giant laughingthrush, Ianthocincla maxima
Greater necklaced laughingthrush, Pterorhinus pectoralis
White-throated laughingthrush, Pterorhinus albogularis
Rufous-crowned laughingthrush, Pterorhinus ruficeps
Rufous-necked laughingthrush, Pterorhinus ruficollis
Chestnut-backed laughingthrush, Pterorhinus nuchalis
Black-throated laughingthrush, Pterorhinus chinensis
White-cheeked laughingthrush, Pterorhinus vassali
Yellow-throated laughingthrush, Pterorhinus galbanus 
Blue-crowned laughingthrush, Pterorhinus courtoisi
Wynaad laughingthrush, Pterorhinus delesserti
Rufous-vented laughingthrush, Pterorhinus gularis
Pere David's laughingthrush, Pterorhinus davidi
Gray-sided laughingthrush, Pterorhinus caerulatus
Rusty laughingthrush, Pterorhinus poecilorhynchus
Buffy laughingthrush, Pterorhinus berthemyi
Chestnut-capped laughingthrush, Pterorhinus mitratus
Chestnut-hooded laughingthrush, Pterorhinus treacheri
White-browed laughingthrush, Pterorhinus sannio
Masked laughingthrush, Pterorhinus perspicillatus
Chinese babax, Pterorhinus lanceolata
Mount Victoria babax, Pterorhinus woodi
Giant babax, Pterorhinus waddelli
Tibetan babax, Pterorhinus koslowi
Streaked laughingthrush, Trochalopteron lineatum
Bhutan laughingthrush, Trochalopteron imbricatum
Striped laughingthrush, Trochalopteron virgatum
Scaly laughingthrush, Trochalopteron subunicolor
Brown-capped laughingthrush, Trochalopteron austeni
Blue-winged laughingthrush, Trochalopteron squamatum
Elliot's laughingthrush, Trochalopteron elliotii
Variegated laughingthrush, Trochalopteron variegatum
Prince Henry's laughingthrush, Trochalopteron henrici
Black-faced laughingthrush, Trochalopteron affinis
White-whiskered laughingthrush, Trochalopteron morrisonianum
Chestnut-crowned laughingthrush, Trochalopteron erythrocephalum
Assam laughingthrush, Trochalopteron chrysopterum
Silver-eared laughingthrush, Trochalopteron melanostigma
Malayan laughingthrush, Trochalopteron peninsulae
Golden-winged laughingthrush, Trochalopteron ngoclinhense
Collared laughingthrush, Trochalopteron yersini
Red-winged laughingthrush, Trochalopteron formosum
Red-tailed laughingthrush, Trochalopteron milnei
Banasura laughingthrush, Montecincla jerdoni
Nilgiri laughingthrush, Montecincla cachinnans
Palani laughingthrush, Montecincla fairbanki
Ashambu laughingthrush, Montecincla meridionalis
Rufous sibia, Heterophasia capistrata
Gray sibia, Heterophasia gracilis
Black-backed sibia, Heterophasia melanoleuca
Black-headed sibia, Heterophasia desgodinsi
White-eared sibia, Heterophasia auricularis
Beautiful sibia, Heterophasia pulchella
Long-tailed sibia, Heterophasia picaoides
Silver-eared mesia, Leiothrix argentauris
Red-billed leiothrix, Leiothrix lutea
Red-tailed minla, Minla ignoti
Rufous-backed sibia, Leioptila annectens
Gray-crowned crocias, Laniellus langbianis
Spotted crocias, Laniellus albonotatus
Gray-faced liocichla, Liocichla omeiensis
Bugun liocichla, Liocichla bugunorum
Steere's liocichla, Liocichla steerii
Red-faced liocichla, Liocichla phoenicea
Scarlet-faced liocichla, Liocichla ripponi
Black-crowned barwing, Actinodura sodangorum
Hoary-throated barwing, Actinodura nipalensis
Streak-throated barwing, Actinodura waldeni
Streaked barwing, Actinodura souliei
Taiwan barwing, Actinodura morrisoniana
Rusty-fronted barwing, Actinodura egertoni
Spectacled barwing, Actinodura ramsayi
Blue-winged minla, Actinodura cyanouroptera
Chestnut-tailed minla, Actinodura strigula

Kinglets
Order: PasseriformesFamily: Regulidae

The kinglets, also called crests, are a small group of birds often included in the Old World warblers, but frequently given family status because they also resemble the titmice.

Ruby-crowned kinglet, Corthylio calendula
Goldcrest, Regulus regulus
Flamecrest, Regulus goodfellowi
Common firecrest, Regulus ignicapilla
Madeira firecrest, Regulus madeirensis

Wallcreeper
Order: PasseriformesFamily: Tichodromidae

The wallcreeper is a small bird, with stunning crimson, gray and black plumage, related to the nuthatch family.

Wallcreeper, Tichodroma muraria

Nuthatches
Order: PasseriformesFamily: Sittidae

Nuthatches are small woodland birds. They have the unusual ability to climb down trees head first, unlike other birds which can only go upwards. Nuthatches have big heads, short tails and powerful bills and feet.

Indian nuthatch, Sitta castanea
Chestnut-bellied nuthatch, Sitta cinnamoventris
Burmese nuthatch, Sitta neglecta
Eurasian nuthatch, Sitta europaea
Chestnut-vented nuthatch, Sitta nagaensis
Kashmir nuthatch, Sitta cashmirensis
White-tailed nuthatch, Sitta himalayensis
White-browed nuthatch, Sitta victoriae
Red-breasted nuthatch, Sitta canadensis
White-cheeked nuthatch, Sitta leucopsis
Przevalski's nuthatch, Sitta przewalskii
Krüper's nuthatch, Sitta krueperi
Snowy-browed nuthatch, Sitta villosa
Yunnan nuthatch, Sitta yunnanensis
Western rock nuthatch, Sitta neumayer
Eastern rock nuthatch, Sitta tephronota
Velvet-fronted nuthatch, Sitta frontalis
Yellow-billed nuthatch, Sitta solangiae
Sulphur-billed nuthatch, Sitta oenochlamys
Blue nuthatch, Sitta azurea
Giant nuthatch, Sitta magna
Beautiful nuthatch, Sitta formosa
Corsican nuthatch, Sitta whiteheadi
Algerian nuthatch, Sitta ledanti

Treecreepers
Order: PasseriformesFamily: Certhiidae

Treecreepers are small woodland birds, brown above and white below. They have thin pointed down-curved bills, which they use to extricate insects from bark. They have stiff tail feathers, like woodpeckers, which they use to support themselves on vertical trees.

Eurasian treecreeper, Certhia familiaris
Hodgson's treecreeper, Certhia hodgsoni
Sichuan treecreeper, Certhia tianquanensis
Short-toed treecreeper, Certhia brachydactyla
Bar-tailed treecreeper, Certhia himalayana
Rusty-flanked treecreeper, Certhia nipalensis
Sikkim treecreeper, Certhia discolor
Hume's treecreeper, Certhia manipurensis
Indian spotted creeper, Salpornis spilonota

Wrens
Order: PasseriformesFamily: Troglodytidae

The wrens are mainly small and inconspicuous except for their loud songs. These birds have short wings and thin down-turned bills. Several species often hold their tails upright. All are insectivorous.

Eurasian wren, Troglodytes troglodytes
Pacific wren, Troglodytes pacificus
Winter wren, Troglodytes hiemalis
Marsh wren, Cistothorus palustris

Spotted elachura
Order: PasseriformesFamily: Elachuridae

This species, the only one in its family, inhabits forest undergrowth throughout South East Asia.

Spotted elachura, Elachura formosa

Dippers
Order: PasseriformesFamily: Cinclidae

Dippers are a group of perching birds whose habitat includes aquatic environments in the Americas, Europe and Asia. They are named for their bobbing or dipping movements.

White-throated dipper, Cinclus cinclus
Brown dipper, Cinclus pallasii

Oxpeckers
Red-billed oxpecker, Buphagus erythrorhynchus (A)

Starlings
Order: PasseriformesFamily: Sturnidae

Starlings are small to medium-sized passerine birds. Their flight is strong and direct and they are very gregarious. Their preferred habitat is fairly open country. They eat insects and fruit. Plumage is typically dark with a metallic sheen.

Stripe-sided rhabdornis, Rhabdornis mysticalis
Long-billed rhabdornis, Rhabdornis grandis
Stripe-breasted rhabdornis, Rhabdornis inornatus
Visayan rhabdornis, Rhabdornis rabori
Fiery-browed myna, Enodes erythrophris
Finch-billed myna, Scissirostrum dubium
Metallic starling, Aplonis metallica
Yellow-eyed starling, Aplonis mystacea
Tanimbar starling, Aplonis crassa
Long-tailed starling, Aplonis magna
Singing starling, Aplonis cantoroides
Asian glossy starling, Aplonis panayensis
Moluccan starling, Aplonis mysolensis
Polynesian starling, Aplonis tabuensis
Short-tailed starling, Aplonis minor
Sulawesi myna, Basilornis celebensis
Helmeted myna, Basilornis galeatus
Long-crested myna, Basilornis corythaix
Apo myna, Basilornis mirandus
Coleto, Sarcops calvus
White-necked myna, Streptocitta albicollis
Bare-eyed myna, Streptocitta albertinae
Yellow-faced myna, Mino dumontii
Golden myna, Mino anais
Golden-crested myna, Ampeliceps coronatus
Sri Lanka myna, Gracula ptilogenys
Common hill myna, Gracula religiosa
Southern hill myna, Gracula indica
Enggano myna, Gracula enganensis
Nias myna, Gracula robusta
European starling, Sturnus vulgaris
Spotless starling, Sturnus unicolor
Wattled starling, Creatophora cinerea
Rosy starling, Pastor roseus
Daurian starling, Agropsar sturninus
Chestnut-cheeked starling, Agropsar philippensis
Black-collared starling, Gracupica nigricollis
Indian pied starling, Gracupica contra
Javan pied starling, Gracupica jalla
Siamese pied starling, Gracupica floweri
White-faced starling, Sturnornis albofrontata
Bali myna, Leucopsar rothschildi
White-shouldered starling, Sturnia sinensis
Brahminy starling, Sturnia pagodarum
Chestnut-tailed starling, Sturnia malabarica
Malabar starling, Sturnia blythii
Red-billed starling, Spodiopsar sericeus
White-cheeked starling, Spodiopsar cineraceus
Common myna, Acridotheres tristis
Bank myna, Acridotheres ginginianus
Burmese myna, Acridotheres burmannicus
Vinous-breasted myna, Acridotheres leucocephalus
Black-winged myna, Acridotheres melanopterus
Jungle myna, Acridotheres fuscus
Javan myna, Acridotheres javanicus
Pale-bellied myna, Acridotheres cinereus
Collared myna, Acridotheres albocinctus
Great myna, Acridotheres grandis
Crested myna, Acridotheres cristatellus
Tristram's starling, Onychognathus tristramii
Somali starling, Onychognathus blythii
Socotra starling, Onychognathus frater
Spot-winged starling, Saroglossa spilopterus
Purple starling, Lamprotornis purpureus
Superb starling, Lamprotornis superbus
Splendid starling, Lamprotornis splendidus
Golden-breasted starling, Lamprotornis regius
Greater blue-eared starling, Lamprotornis chalybaeus
Cape starling, Lamprotornis nitens 
Violet-backed starling, Cinnyricinclus leucogaster

Mimids
Gray catbird, Dumetella carolinensis
Brown thrasher, Toxostoma rufum
Tropical mockingbird, Mimus gilvus

Thrushes and allies
Order: PasseriformesFamily: Turdidae

The thrushes are a group of passerine birds that occur mainly in the Old World. They are plump, soft plumaged, small to medium-sized insectivores or sometimes omnivores, often feeding on the ground. Many have attractive songs.

Grandala, Grandala coelicolor
Long-tailed thrush, Zoothera dixoni
Alpine thrush, Zoothera mollissima
Himalayan thrush, Zoothera salimalii
Sichuan thrush, Zoothera griseiceps
Geomalia, Zoothera heinrichi
Dark-sided thrush, Zoothera marginata
Long-billed thrush, Zoothera monticola
Everett's thrush, Zoothera everetti
Sunda thrush, Zoothera andromedae
White's thrush, Zoothera aurea
Scaly thrush, Zoothera dauma
Amami thrush, Zoothera major
Nilgiri thrush, Zoothera neilgherriensis
Sri Lanka thrush, Zoothera imbricata
Bonin thrush, Zoothera terrestris (X)
Russet-tailed thrush, Zoothera heinei
Fawn-breasted thrush, Zoothera machiki
Sulawesi thrush, Cataponera turdoides
Fruit-hunter, Chlamydochaera jefferyi
Purple cochoa, Cochoa purpurea
Green cochoa, Cochoa viridis
Sumatran cochoa, Cochoa beccarii
Javan cochoa, Cochoa azurea
Varied thrush, Ixoreus naevius
Gray-cheeked thrush, Catharus minimus
Swainson's thrush, Catharus ustulatus (A)
Hermit thrush, Catharus guttatus
Veery, Catharus fuscescens
Bicknell's thrush, Catharus  bicknelli
Siberian thrush, Geokichla sibirica
Pied thrush, Geokichla wardii
Spot-winged thrush, Geokichla spiloptera
Ashy thrush, Geokichla cinerea
Buru thrush, Geokichla dumasi
Seram thrush, Geokichla joiceyi
Chestnut-capped thrush, Geokichla interpres
Enggano thrush, Geokichla leucolaema
Chestnut-backed thrush, Geokichla dohertyi
Orange-banded thrush, Geokichla peronii
Slaty-backed thrush, Geokichla schistacea
Rusty-backed thrush, Geokichla erythronota
Red-and-black thrush, Geokichla mendeni
Orange-headed thrush, Geokichla citrina
Chinese thrush, Otocichla mupinensis
Mistle thrush, Turdus viscivorus
Song thrush, Turdus philomelos
Redwing, Turdus iliacus
Eurasian blackbird, Turdus merula
Chinese blackbird, Turdus mandarinus
Yemen thrush, Turdus menachensis
American robin, Turdus migratorius (A)
Taiwan thrush, Turdus niveiceps
Gray-winged blackbird, Turdus boulboul
Indian blackbird, Turdus simillimus
Japanese thrush, Turdus cardis
Gray-backed thrush, Turdus hortulorum
Tickell's thrush, Turdus unicolor
Black-breasted thrush, Turdus dissimilis
Gray-sided thrush, Turdus feae
Eyebrowed thrush, Turdus obscurus
Brown-headed thrush, Turdus chrysolaus
Izu thrush, Turdus celaenops
Pale thrush, Turdus pallidus
Island thrush, Turdus poliocephalus
White-backed thrush, Turdus kessleri
Tibetan blackbird, Turdus maximus
Fieldfare, Turdus pilaris
White-collared blackbird, Turdus albocinctus
Chestnut thrush, Turdus rubrocanus
Ring ouzel, Turdus torquatus
Black-throated thrush, Turdus atrogularis
Red-throated thrush, Turdus ruficollis
Dusky thrush, Turdus eunomus
Naumann's thrush, Turdus naumanni
Rufous-bellied thrush, Turdus rufiventris
Austral thrush, Turdus falcklandii
Wood thrush, Hylocichla mustelina

Old World flycatchers
Order: PasseriformesFamily: Muscicapidae

Old World flycatchers are a large group of small arboreal insectivores. The appearance of these birds is highly varied, but they mostly have weak songs and harsh calls.

Gray-streaked flycatcher, Muscicapa griseisticta
Dark-sided flycatcher, Muscicapa sibirica
Ferruginous flycatcher, Muscicapa ferruginea
Asian brown flycatcher, Muscicapa dauurica
Ashy-breasted flycatcher, Muscicapa randi
Sumba brown flycatcher, Muscicapa segregata
Brown-breasted flycatcher, Muscicapa muttui
Sulawesi brown flycatcher, Muscicapa sodhii (E)
Brown-streaked flycatcher, Muscicapa williamsoni
Spotted flycatcher, Muscicapa striata
Gambaga flycatcher, Muscicapa gambagae
Black scrub-robin, Cercotrichas podobe
Rufous-tailed scrub-robin, Cercotrichas galactotes
Indian robin, Copsychus fulicatus
Oriental magpie-robin, Copsychus saularis
Rufous-tailed shama, Copsychus pyrropygus
Philippine magpie-robin, Copsychus mindanensis
White-rumped shama, Copsychus malabaricus
White-crowned shama, Copsychus stricklandii
Andaman shama, Copsychus albiventris 
White-browed shama, Copsychus luzoniensis
Visayan shama, Copsychus superciliaris
White-vented shama, Copsychus niger
Black shama, Copsychus cebuensis
White-gorgeted flycatcher, Anthipes monileger
Rufous-browed flycatcher, Anthipes solitaris
Nilgiri sholakili, Sholicola major
White-bellied sholakili, Sholicola albiventris
Matinan flycatcher, Cyornis sanfordi
Blue-fronted flycatcher, Cyornis hoevelli
Timor blue flycatcher, Cyornis hyacinthinus
White-tailed flycatcher, Cyornis concretus
Rück's blue flycatcher, Cyornis ruckii
Blue-breasted flycatcher, Cyornis herioti
Hainan blue flycatcher, Cyornis hainanus
White-bellied blue flycatcher, Cyornis pallipes
Pale-chinned blue flycatcher, Cyornis poliogenys
Pale blue flycatcher, Cyornis unicolor
Blue-throated flycatcher, Cyornis rubeculoides
Chinese blue flycatcher, Cyornis glaucicomans
Large blue flycatcher, Cyornis magnirostris
Hill blue flycatcher, Cyornis whitei
Javan blue flycatcher, Cyornis banyumas
Dayak blue flycatcher, Cyornis montanus
Meratus blue flycatcher, Cyornis kadayangensis
Sunda blue flycatcher, Cyornis caerulatus
Malaysian blue flycatcher, Cyornis turcosus
Palawan blue flycatcher, Cyornis lemprieri
Bornean blue flycatcher, Cyornis superbus
Tickell's blue flycatcher, Cyornis tickelliae
Indochinese blue flycatcher, Cyornis sumatrensis
Mangrove blue flycatcher, Cyornis rufigastra
Sulawesi blue flycatcher, Cyornis omissus
Brown-chested jungle-flycatcher, Cyornis brunneatus
Nicobar jungle-flycatcher, Cyornis nicobaricus
Gray-chested jungle-flycatcher,  Cyornis umbratilis
Fulvous-chested jungle-flycatcher, Cyornis olivaceus
Chestnut-tailed jungle-flycatcher, Cyornis ruficauda
Banggai jungle-flycatcher, Cyornis pelingensis
Sula jungle-flycatcher, Cyornis colonus
Large niltava, Niltava grandis
Small niltava, Niltava macgrigoriae
Fujian niltava, Niltava davidi
Rufous-bellied niltava, Niltava sundara
Rufous-vented niltava, Niltava sumatrana
Chinese vivid niltava, Niltava oatesi
Taiwan vivid niltava, Niltava vivida
Blue-and-white flycatcher, Cyanoptila cyanomelana
Zappey's flycatcher, Cyanoptila cumatilis
Flores jungle flycatcher, Eumyias oscillans
Sumba jungle flycatcher, Eumyias stresemanni
Dull-blue flycatcher, Eumyias sordidus
Nilgiri flycatcher, Eumyias sordidus
Indigo flycatcher, Eumyias indigo
Verditer flycatcher, Eumyias thalassinus
Buru jungle-flycatcher, Eumyias additus
Turquoise flycatcher, Eumyias panayensis
European robin, Erithacus rubecula
Bagobo robin, Leonardina woodi
Eyebrowed jungle-flycatcher, Vauriella gularis
Rusty-flanked jungle-flycatcher, Vauriella insignis
Negros jungle-flycatcher, Vauriella albigularis
Mindanao jungle-flycatcher, Vauriella goodfellowi
Great shortwing, Heinrichia calligyna
Rusty-bellied shortwing, Brachypteryx hyperythra
Gould's shortwing, Brachypteryx stellata
Lesser shortwing, Brachypteryx leucophrys
Himalayan shortwing, Brachypteryx cruralis
Chinese shortwing, Brachypteryx sinensis
Taiwan shortwing, Brachypteryx goodfellowi
Philippine shortwing, Brachypteryx poliogyna
Bornean shortwing, Brachypteryx erythrogyna
Sumatran shortwing, Brachypteryx saturata
Javan shortwing, Brachypteryx montana
Flores shortwing, Brachypteryx floris
Rufous-tailed robin, Larvivora sibilans
Rufous-headed robin, Larvivora ruficeps
Japanese robin, Larvivora akahige
Izu robin, Larvivora tanensis
Ryukyu robin, Larvivora komadori
Okinawa robin, Larvivora namiyei.
Indian blue robin, Larvivora brunnea
Siberian blue robin, Larvivora cyane
White-throated robin, Irania gutturalis
Thrush nightingale, Luscinia luscinia
Common nightingale, Luscinia megarhynchos
White-bellied redstart, Luscinia phaenicuroides
Bluethroat, Luscinia svecica
Sri Lanka whistling-thrush, Myophonus blighi
Shiny whistling-thrush, Myophonus melanurus
Javan whistling-thrush, Myophonus glaucinus
Sumatran whistling-thrush, Myophonus castaneus
Bornean whistling-thrush, Myophonus borneensis
Malayan whistling-thrush, Myophonus robinsoni
Malabar whistling-thrush, Myophonus horsfieldii
Taiwan whistling-thrush, Myophonus insularis
Blue whistling-thrush, Myophonus caeruleus
Little forktail, Enicurus scouleri
White-crowned forktail, Enicurus leschenaulti
Bornean forktail, Enicurus borneensis
Spotted forktail, Enicurus maculatus
Sunda forktail, Enicurus velatus
Chestnut-naped forktail, Enicurus ruficapillus
Black-backed forktail, Enicurus immaculatus
Slaty-backed forktail, Enicurus schistaceus
Firethroat, Calliope pectardens
Blackthroat, Calliope obscura
Siberian rubythroat, Calliope calliope
Himalayan rubythroat, Calliope pectoralis
Chinese rubythroat, Calliope tschebaiewi
White-tailed robin, Myiomela leucurum
Sunda robin, Myiomela diana
Blue-fronted robin, Cinclidium frontale
Red-flanked bluetail, Tarsiger cyanurus
Himalayan bluetail, Tarsiger rufilatus
Rufous-breasted bush-robin, Tarsiger hyperythrus
White-browed bush-robin, Tarsiger indicus
Golden bush-robin, Tarsiger chrysaeus
Collared bush-robin, Tarsiger johnstoniae
Yellow-rumped flycatcher, Ficedula zanthopygia
Green-backed flycatcher, Ficedula elisae
Narcissus flycatcher, Ficedula narcissina
Ryukyu flycatcher, Ficedula owstoni
Mugimaki flycatcher, Ficedula mugimaki
Slaty-backed flycatcher, Ficedula hodgsonii
Black-and-orange flycatcher, Ficedula nigrorufa
Slaty-blue flycatcher, Ficedula tricolor
Snowy-browed flycatcher, Ficedula hyperythra
Pygmy flycatcher, Ficedula hodgsoni
Rufous-gorgeted flycatcher, Ficedula strophiata
Sapphire flycatcher, Ficedula sapphira
Little pied flycatcher, Ficedula westermanni
Ultramarine flycatcher, Ficedula superciliaris
Rusty-tailed flycatcher, Ficedula ruficauda
Taiga flycatcher, Ficedula albicilla
Kashmir flycatcher, Ficedula subrubra
Red-breasted flycatcher, Ficedula parva
Semicollared flycatcher, Ficedula semitorquata
European pied flycatcher, Ficedula hypoleuca
Collared flycatcher, Ficedula albicollis
Tanimbar flycatcher, Ficedula riedeli
Rufous-chested flycatcher, Ficedula dumetoria
Palawan flycatcher, Ficedula platenae
Furtive flycatcher, Ficedula disposita
Rufous-throated flycatcher, Ficedula rufigula
Damar flycatcher, Ficedula henrici
Cinnamon-chested flycatcher, Ficedula buruensis
Lompobattang flycatcher, Ficedula bonthaina
Sumba flycatcher, Ficedula harterti
Black-banded flycatcher, Ficedula timorensis
Beijing flycatcher, Ficedula beijingnica
Cryptic flycatcher, Ficedula crypta
Bundok flycatcher, Ficedula luzoniensis
Blue-fronted redstart, Phoenicurus frontalis
Plumbeous redstart, Phoenicurus fuliginosus
Luzon redstart, Phoenicurus bicolor
Rufous-backed redstart, Phoenicurus erythronotus
White-capped redstart, Phoenicurus leucocephalus
Ala Shan redstart, Phoenicurus alaschanicus
Blue-capped redstart, Phoenicurus caeruleocephala
Common redstart, Phoenicurus phoenicurus
Hodgson's redstart, Phoenicurus hodgsoni
White-throated redstart, Phoenicurus schisticeps
White-winged redstart, Phoenicurus erythrogastrus
Black redstart, Phoenicurus ochruros
Daurian redstart, Phoenicurus auroreus
Moussier's redstart, Phoenicurus moussieri
Little rock-thrush, Monticola rufocinereus
Chestnut-bellied rock-thrush, Monticola rufiventris
White-throated rock-thrush, Monticola gularis
Blue-capped rock-thrush, Monticola cinclorhyncha
Rufous-tailed rock-thrush, Monticola saxatilis
Blue rock-thrush, Monticola solitarius
Whinchat, Saxicola rubetra
White-browed bushchat, Saxicola macrorhynchus
White-throated bushchat, Saxicola insignis
European stonechat, Saxicola rubicola
Siberian stonechat, Saxicola maurus
Amur stonechat, Saxicola stejnegeri
White-tailed stonechat, Saxicola leucurus
Pied bushchat, Saxicola caprata
Jerdon's bushchat, Saxicola jerdoni
Gray bushchat, Saxicola ferreus
Timor bushchat, Saxicola gutturalis
African stonechat, Saxicola torquatus 
Northern wheatear, Oenanthe oenanthe
Isabelline wheatear, Oenanthe isabellina
Hooded wheatear, Oenanthe monacha
Desert wheatear, Oenanthe deserti
Pied wheatear, Oenanthe pleschanka
Eastern black-eared wheatear, Oenanthe melanoleuca
Cyprus wheatear, Oenanthe cypriaca
Red-rumped wheatear, Oenanthe moesta
Blackstart, Oenanthe melanura
Familiar chat, Oenanthe familiaris
Brown rock chat, Oenanthe fusca
Variable wheatear, Oenanthe picata
Hume's wheatear, Oenanthe albonigra
White-crowned wheatear, Oenanthe leucopyga
Arabian wheatear, Oenanthe lugentoides
Finsch's wheatear, Oenanthe finschii
Mourning wheatear, Oenanthe lugens
Black wheatear, Oenanthe leucura
Kurdish wheatear, Oenanthe xanthoprymna
Persian wheatear, Oenanthe chrysopygia
Red-breasted wheatear, Oenanthe bottae
Heuglin's wheatear, Oenanthe heuglini
Abyssinian wheatear, Oenanthe lugubris

Waxwings
Order: PasseriformesFamily: Bombycillidae

The waxwings are a group of birds with soft silky plumage and unique red tips to some of the wing feathers. In the Bohemian and cedar waxwings, these tips look like sealing wax and give the group its name. These are arboreal birds of northern forests. They live on insects in summer and berries in winter.

Bohemian waxwing, Bombycilla garrulus
Japanese waxwing, Bombycilla japonica

Hylocitrea
Order: PasseriformesFamily: Hylocitreidae

The hylocitrea (Hylocitrea bonensis), also known as the yellow-flanked whistler or olive-flanked whistler, is a species of bird that is endemic to montane forests on the Indonesian island of Sulawesi.

 Hylocitrea, Hylocitrea bonensis

Hypocolius
Order: PasseriformesFamily: Hypocoliidae

The hypocolius is a small Middle Eastern species. They are mainly a uniform grey colour except the males have a black triangular mask around their eyes.

Hypocolius, Hypocolius ampelinus

Flowerpeckers
Order: PasseriformesFamily: Dicaeidae

The flowerpeckers are very small, stout, often brightly coloured birds, with short tails, short thick curved bills, and tubular tongues.

Olive-backed flowerpecker, Prionochilus olivaceus
Yellow-breasted flowerpecker, Prionochilus maculatus
Crimson-breasted flowerpecker, Prionochilus percussus
Palawan flowerpecker, Prionochilus plateni
Yellow-rumped flowerpecker, Prionochilus xanthopygius
Scarlet-breasted flowerpecker, Prionochilus thoracicus
Spectacled flowerpecker, Dicaeum dayakorum
Golden-rumped flowerpecker, Dicaeum annae
Thick-billed flowerpecker, Dicaeum agile
Brown-backed flowerpecker, Dicaeum everetti
Whiskered flowerpecker, Dicaeum proprium
Yellow-vented flowerpecker, Dicaeum chrysorrheum
Yellow-bellied flowerpecker, Dicaeum melanozanthum
White-throated flowerpecker, Dicaeum vincens
Yellow-sided flowerpecker, Dicaeum aureolimbatum
Olive-capped flowerpecker, Dicaeum nigrilore
Flame-crowned flowerpecker, Dicaeum anthonyi
Bicolored flowerpecker, Dicaeum bicolor
Cebu flowerpecker, Dicaeum quadricolor
Red-keeled flowerpecker, Dicaeum australe
Black-belted flowerpecker, Dicaeum haematostictum
Scarlet-collared flowerpecker, Dicaeum retrocinctum
Orange-bellied flowerpecker, Dicaeum trigonostigma
White-bellied flowerpecker, Dicaeum hypoleucum
Pale-billed flowerpecker, Dicaeum erythrorhynchos
Nilgiri flowerpecker, Dicaeum concolor
Plain flowerpecker, Dicaeum minullum
Andaman flowerpecker, Dicaeum virescens
Pygmy flowerpecker, Dicaeum pygmaeum
Crimson-crowned flowerpecker, Dicaeum nehrkorni
Halmahera flowerpecker, Dicaeum schistaceiceps
Buru flowerpecker, Dicaeum erythrothorax
Ashy flowerpecker, Dicaeum vulneratum
Olive-crowned flowerpecker, Dicaeum pectorale
Red-capped flowerpecker, Dicaeum geelvinkianum
Black-fronted flowerpecker, Dicaeum igniferum
Red-chested flowerpecker, Dicaeum maugei
Fire-breasted flowerpecker, Dicaeum ignipectus
Black-sided flowerpecker, Dicaeum monticolum
Gray-sided flowerpecker, Dicaeum celebicum
Blood-breasted flowerpecker, Dicaeum sanguinolentum
Mistletoebird, Dicaeum hirundinaceum
Scarlet-backed flowerpecker, Dicaeum cruentatum
Scarlet-headed flowerpecker, Dicaeum trochileum

Sunbirds and spiderhunters
Order: PasseriformesFamily: Nectariniidae

The sunbirds and spiderhunters are very small passerine birds which feed largely on nectar, although they will also take insects, especially when feeding young. Their flight is fast and direct on short wings. Most species can take nectar by hovering like a hummingbird, but usually perch to feed.

Ruby-cheeked sunbird, Chalcoparia singalensis
Plain sunbird, Anthreptes simplex
Brown-throated sunbird, Anthreptes malacensis
Gray-throated sunbird, Anthreptes griseigularis
Red-throated sunbird, Anthreptes rhodolaemus
Nile Valley sunbird, Hedydipna metallica
Pygmy sunbird, Hedydipna platura 
Purple-naped sunbird, Hypogramma hypogrammicum
Purple-rumped sunbird, Leptocoma zeylonica
Crimson-backed sunbird, Leptocoma minima
Van Hasselt's sunbird, Leptocoma brasiliana
Purple-throated sunbird, Leptocoma sperata
Black sunbird, Leptocoma sericea
Copper-throated sunbird, Leptocoma calcostetha
Palestine sunbird, Cinnyris osea
Purple sunbird, Cinnyris asiaticus
Olive-backed sunbird, Cinnyris jugularis
Apricot-breasted sunbird, Cinnyris buettikoferi
Flame-breasted sunbird, Cinnyris solaris
Loten's sunbird, Cinnyris lotenius
Shining sunbird, Cinnyris habessinicus
Variable sunbird, Cinnyris venustus
Orange-tufted sunbird, Cinnyris bouvieri
Elegant sunbird, Aethopyga duyvenbodei
Fire-tailed sunbird, Aethopyga ignicauda
Black-throated sunbird, Aethopyga saturata
Mrs. Gould's sunbird, Aethopyga gouldiae
Green-tailed sunbird, Aethopyga nipalensis
Lovely sunbird, Aethopyga shelleyi
Temminck's sunbird, Aethopyga temminckii
Javan sunbird, Aethopyga mystacalis
Vigors's sunbird, Aethopyga vigorsii
Crimson sunbird, Aethopyga siparaja
Magnificent sunbird, Aethopyga magnifica
Fork-tailed sunbird, Aethopyga christinae
Handsome sunbird, Aethopyga bella
White-flanked sunbird, Aethopyga eximia
Flaming sunbird, Aethopyga flagrans
Maroon-naped sunbird, Aethopyga guimarasensis
Metallic-winged sunbird, Aethopyga pulcherrima
Mountain sunbird, Aethopyga jefferyi
Bohol sunbird, Aethopyga decorosa
Lina's sunbird, Aethopyga linaraborae
Gray-hooded sunbird, Aethopyga primigenia
Apo sunbird, Aethopyga boltoni
Tboli sunbird, Aethopyga tibolii
Purple-naped spiderhunter, Kurochkinegramma hypogrammicum
Thick-billed spiderhunter, Arachnothera crassirostris
Long-billed spiderhunter, Arachnothera robusta
Orange-tufted spiderhunter, Arachnothera flammifera
Pale spiderhunter, Arachnothera dilutior
Little spiderhunter, Arachnothera longirostra
Whitehead's spiderhunter, Arachnothera juliae
Naked-faced spiderhunter, Arachnothera clarae
Yellow-eared spiderhunter, Arachnothera chrysogenys
Spectacled spiderhunter, Arachnothera flavigaster
Streaked spiderhunter, Arachnothera magna
Streaky-breasted spiderhunter, Arachnothera affinis
Gray-breasted spiderhunter, Arachnothera modesta
Bornean spiderhunter, Arachnothera everetti
Socotra sunbird, Chalcomitra balfouri
Scarlet-chested sunbird, Chalcomitra senegalensis

Fairy-bluebirds
Order: PasseriformesFamily: Irenidae

The fairy-bluebirds are bulbul-like birds of open forest or thorn scrub. The males are dark-blue and the females a duller green.

Asian fairy-bluebird, Irena puella
Philippine fairy-bluebird, Irena cyanogastra

Leafbirds
Order: PasseriformesFamily: Chloropseidae

The leafbirds are small, bulbul-like birds. The males are brightly plumaged, usually in greens and yellows.

Philippine leafbird, Chloropsis flavipennis
Yellow-throated leafbird, Chloropsis palawanensis
Greater green leafbird, Chloropsis sonnerati
Lesser green leafbird, Chloropsis cyanopogon
Blue-winged leafbird, Chloropsis cochinchinensis
Bornean leafbird, Chloropsis kinabaluensis
Jerdon's leafbird, Chloropsis jerdoni
Golden-fronted leafbird, Chloropsis aurifrons
Sumatran leafbird, Chloropsis media
Orange-bellied leafbird, Chloropsis hardwickii
Blue-masked leafbird, Chloropsis venusta

Pinktails
Order: PasseriformesFamily: Urocynchramidae

Przevalski's pinktail is an unusual passerine bird endemic to the mountains of central-west China.

Przevalski's pinktail, Urocynchramus pylzowi

Weavers and allies
Order: PasseriformesFamily: Ploceidae

The weavers are small passerine birds related to the finches. They are seed-eating birds with rounded conical bills. The males of many species are brightly colored, usually in red or yellow and black, some species show variation in color only in the breeding season.

Lesser masked-weaver, Ploceus intermedius (I)
Rüppell's weaver, Ploceus galbula
Golden-backed weaver, Ploceus jacksoni (I)
Streaked weaver, Ploceus manyar
Baya weaver, Ploceus philippinus
Asian golden weaver, Ploceus hypoxanthus
Finn's weaver, Ploceus megarhynchus
Black-breasted weaver, Ploceus benghalensis
Red fody, Foudia madagascariensis (I)
Southern masked-weaver, Ploceus velatus
Village weaver, Ploceus cucullatus
Taveta golden-weaver, Ploceus castaneiceps
Chestnut weaver, Ploceus rubiginosus
Black-headed weaver, Ploceus melanocephalus
African golden-weaver, Ploceus subaureus
Northern red bishop, Euplectes franciscanus (I)
Yellow-crowned bishop, Euplectes afer (I)
Southern red bishop, Euplectes orix
Black-winged bishop, Euplectes hordeaceus
White-winged widowbird, Euplectes albonotatus 
Zanzibar red bishop, Euplectes nigroventris
Red-collared widowbird, Euplectes ardens
Fire-fronted bishop, Euplectes diadematus
Long-tailed widowbird, Euplectes progne
Red-billed Quelea, Quelea quelea
Red-headed Quelea, Quelea erythrops
White-headed Buffalo-weaver, Dinemellia dinemelli

Waxbills and allies
Order: PasseriformesFamily: Estrildidae

The estrildid finches are small passerine birds of the Old World tropics and Australasia. They are gregarious and often colonial seed eaters with short thick but pointed bills. They are all similar in structure and habits, but have a wide variation in plumage colors and patterns.

Orange-cheeked waxbill, Estrilda melpoda (I)
Arabian waxbill, Estrilda rufibarba
Crimson-rumped waxbill, Estrilda rhodopyga (I)
Black-rumped waxbill, Estrilda troglodytes (I)
Common waxbill, Estrilda astrild
Lavender waxbill, Glaucestrilda coerulescens 
Zebra waxbill, Amandava subflava
Green avadavat, Amandava formosa
Red avadavat, Amandava amandava
Mountain firetail, Oreostruthus fuliginosus
Crimson finch, Neochmia phaeton
Zebra finch, Taeniopygia guttata
Tawny-breasted parrotfinch, Erythrura hyperythra
Pin-tailed parrotfinch, Erythrura prasina
Green-faced parrotfinch, Erythrura viridifacies
Tricolored parrotfinch, Erythrura tricolor
Blue-faced parrotfinch, Erythrura trichroa
Red-eared parrotfinch, Erythrura coloria
Papuan parrotfinch, Erythrura papuana
Fiji parrotfinch, Erythrura pealii 
Pink-billed parrotfinch, Erythrura kleinschmidti
Indian silverbill, Euodice malabarica
African silverbill, Euodice cantans
Streak-headed munia, Mayrimunia tristissima
White-spotted munia, Mayrimunia leucosticta
White-rumped munia, Lonchura striata
Javan munia, Lonchura leucogastroides
Dusky munia, Lonchura fuscans
Black-faced munia, Lonchura molucca
Black-throated munia, Lonchura kelaarti
Scaly-breasted munia, Lonchura punctulata
White-bellied munia, Lonchura leucogastra
Tricolored munia, Lonchura malacca
Chestnut munia, Lonchura atricapilla (I)
White-capped munia, Lonchura ferruginosa
Five-colored munia, Lonchura quinticolor
White-headed munia, Lonchura maja
Pale-headed munia, Lonchura pallida
Grand munia, Lonchura grandis
Gray-banded munia, Lonchura vana
Gray-crowned munia, Lonchura nevermanni
Hooded munia, Lonchura spectabilis
Chestnut-breasted munia, Lonchura castaneothorax
Black munia, Lonchura stygia
Black-breasted munia, Lonchura teerinki
Snow Mountain munia, Lonchura montana
Alpine munia, Lonchura monticola
Java sparrow, Padda oryzivora (I)
Timor sparrow, Padda fuscata
Green-winged pytilia, Pytilia melba
Black-and-white mannikin, Spermestes bicolor
Bronze mannikin, Spermestes  cucullata
Cut-throat, Amadina fasciata
Blue-capped cordonbleu, Uraeginthus cyanocephalus
Red-cheeked cordonbleu, Uraeginthus bengalus
Jameson's firefinch, Lagonosticta rhodopareia
Red-billed firefinch, Lagonosticta senegala
African firefinch, Lagonosticta rubricata

Accentors
Order: PasseriformesFamily: Prunellidae

The accentors are in the only bird family, Prunellidae, which is completely endemic to the Palearctic. They are small, fairly drab species superficially similar to sparrows.

Alpine accentor, Prunella collaris
Altai accentor, Prunella himalayana
Robin accentor, Prunella rubeculoides
Rufous-breasted accentor, Prunella strophiata
Siberian accentor, Prunella montanella
Radde's accentor, Prunella ocularis
Brown accentor, Prunella fulvescens
Black-throated accentor, Prunella atrogularis
Mongolian accentor, Prunella koslowi
Dunnock, Prunella modularis
Japanese accentor, Prunella rubida
Maroon-backed accentor, Prunella immaculata

Old World sparrows
Order: PasseriformesFamily: Passeridae

Old World sparrows are small passerine birds. In general, sparrows tend to be small, plump, brown or gray birds with short tails and short powerful beaks. Sparrows are seed eaters, but they also consume small insects.

Cinnamon ibon, Hypocryptadius cinnamomeus
Saxaul sparrow, Passer ammodendri
House sparrow, Passer domesticus
Spanish sparrow, Passer hispaniolensis
Sind sparrow, Passer pyrrhonotus
Russet sparrow, Passer cinnamomeus
Plain-backed sparrow, Passer flaveolus
Dead Sea sparrow, Passer moabiticus
Zarudny's sparrow, Passer zarudnyi
Eurasian tree sparrow, Passer montanus
Arabian golden sparrow, Passer euchlorus
Abd al-Kuri sparrow, Passer hemileucus
Socotra sparrow, Passer insularis
Sudan golden sparrow, Passer luteus
Cape Verde sparrow, Passer iagoensis
Desert sparrow, Passer simplex
Somali sparrow, Passer castanopterus
Cape sparrow, Passer melanurus
Yellow-throated sparrow, Gymnoris xanthocollis
Sahel bush sparrow, Gymnoris dentata
Rock sparrow, Petronia petronia
Pale rockfinch, Carpospiza brachydactyla
White-winged snowfinch, Montifringilla nivalis
Black-winged snowfinch, Montifringilla adamsi
Tibetan snowfinch, Montifringilla henrici
White-rumped snowfinch, Montifringilla taczanowskii
Pere David's snowfinch, Montifringilla davidiana
Rufous-necked snowfinch, Montifringilla ruficollis
Blanford's snowfinch, Montifringilla blanfordi
Afghan snowfinch, Montifringilla theresae

Wagtails and pipits
Order: PasseriformesFamily: Motacillidae

Motacillidae is a family of small passerine birds with medium to long tails. They include the wagtails, longclaws and pipits. They are slender, ground feeding insectivores of open country.

Forest wagtail, Dendronanthus indicus
Gray wagtail, Motacilla cinerea
Western yellow wagtail, Motacilla flava
Eastern yellow wagtail, Motacilla tschutschensis
Citrine wagtail, Motacilla citreola
White-browed wagtail, Motacilla maderaspatensis
Mekong wagtail, Motacilla samveasnae
Japanese wagtail, Motacilla grandis
White wagtail, Motacilla alba
African pied wagtail, Motacilla aguimp
Madanga, Madanga ruficollis
Richard's pipit, Anthus richardi
Paddyfield pipit, Anthus rufulus
Long-billed pipit, Anthus similis
Blyth's pipit, Anthus godlewskii
Tawny pipit, Anthus campestris
Nilgiri pipit, Anthus nilghiriensis
Upland pipit, Anthus sylvanus
Alpine pipit, Anthus gutturalis
Meadow pipit, Anthus pratensis
Rosy pipit, Anthus roseatus
Tree pipit, Anthus trivialis
Olive-backed pipit, Anthus hodgsoni
Pechora pipit, Anthus gustavi
Red-throated pipit, Anthus cervinus
Water pipit, Anthus spinoletta
Rock pipit, Anthus petrosus
American pipit, Anthus rubescens
African pipit, Anthus cinnamomeus
Buffy pipit, Anthus vaalensis
Berthelot's pipit, Anthus berthelotii
Golden pipit, Tmetothylacus tenellus

Finches, euphonias, and allies
Order: PasseriformesFamily: Fringillidae

Finches are seed-eating passerine birds, that are small to moderately large and have a strong beak, usually conical and in some species very large. All have twelve tail feathers and nine primaries. These birds have a bouncing flight with alternating bouts of flapping and gliding on closed wings, and most sing well.

Common chaffinch, Fringilla coelebs
Brambling, Fringilla montifringilla
Tenerife blue chaffinch, Fringilla teydea
Gran Canaria blue chaffinch, Fringilla polatzeki
Black-and-yellow grosbeak, Mycerobas icterioides
Collared grosbeak, Mycerobas affinis
Spot-winged grosbeak, Mycerobas melanozanthos
White-winged grosbeak, Mycerobas carnipes
Hawfinch, Coccothraustes coccothraustes
Evening grosbeak, Coccothraustes vespertinus
Yellow-billed grosbeak, Eophona migratoria
Japanese grosbeak, Eophona personata
Common rosefinch, Carpodacus erythrinus
Scarlet finch, Carpodacus sipahi
Bonin grosbeak, Carpodacus ferreorostris
Red-mantled rosefinch, Carpodacus rhodochlamys
Blyth's rosefinch, Carpodacus grandis
Himalayan beautiful rosefinch, Carpodacus pulcherrimus
Chinese beautiful rosefinch, Carpodacus davidianus
Pink-rumped rosefinch, Carpodacus waltoni
Dark-rumped rosefinch, Carpodacus edwardsii
Pink-browed rosefinch, Carpodacus rodochroa
Spot-winged rosefinch, Carpodacus rhodopeplus
Sharpe's rosefinch, Carpodacus verreauxii
Vinaceous rosefinch, Carpodacus vinaceus
Taiwan rosefinch, Carpodacus formosanus
Pale rosefinch, Carpodacus synoicus
Tibetan rosefinch, Carpodacus roborowskii
Sillem's rosefinch, Carpodacus sillemi
Streaked rosefinch, Carpodacus rubicilloides
Great rosefinch, Carpodacus rubicilla
Long-tailed rosefinch, Carpodacus sibiricus
Red-fronted rosefinch, Carpodacus puniceus
Crimson-browed finch, Carpodacus subhimachalus
Pallas's rosefinch, Carpodacus roseus
Three-banded rosefinch, Carpodacus trifasciatus
Himalayan white-browed rosefinch, Carpodacus thura
Chinese white-browed rosefinch, Carpodacus dubius
Pine grosbeak, Pinicola enucleator
Brown bullfinch, Pyrrhula nipalensis
White-cheeked bullfinch, Pyrrhula leucogenis
Orange bullfinch, Pyrrhula aurantiaca
Red-headed bullfinch, Pyrrhula erythrocephala
Gray-headed bullfinch, Pyrrhula erythaca
Taiwan bullfinch, Pyrrhula owstoni
Eurasian bullfinch, Pyrrhula pyrrhula
Azores bullfinch, Pyrrhula murina
Crimson-winged finch, Rhodopechys sanguineus
Trumpeter finch, Bucanetes githagineus
Mongolian finch, Bucanetes mongolicus
Blanford's rosefinch, Agraphospiza rubescens
Gold-naped finch, Pyrrhoplectes epauletta
Spectacled finch, Callacanthis burtoni
Dark-breasted rosefinch, Procarduelis nipalensis
Plain mountain finch, Leucosticte nemoricola
Black-headed mountain finch, Leucosticte brandti
Asian rosy-finch, Leucosticte arctoa
Gray-crowned rosy-finch, Leucosticte tephrocotis
Desert finch, Rhodospiza obsoleta
Arabian grosbeak, Rhynchostruthus percivali
Socotra grosbeak, Rhychostruthus socotranus
European greenfinch, Chloris chloris
Oriental greenfinch, Chloris sinica
Yellow-breasted greenfinch, Chloris spinoides
Vietnamese greenfinch, Chloris monguilloti
Black-headed greenfinch, Chloris ambigua
Yellow-fronted canary, Crithagra mozambica
Olive-rumped serin, Crithagra rothschildi
Yemen serin, Crithagra menachensis
White-rumped seedeater, Crithagra leucopygia
Thick-billed seedeater, Crithagra burtoni
Twite, Linaria flavirostris
Eurasian linnet, Linaria cannabina
Yemen linnet, Linaria yemenensis
Common redpoll, Acanthis flammea
Lesser redpoll, Acanthis cabaret
Hoary redpoll, Acanthis hornemanni
Parrot crossbill, Loxia pytyopsittacus
Red crossbill, Loxia curvirostra
White-winged crossbill, Loxia leucoptera
Scottish crossbill, Loxia scotica
Mountain serin, Chrysocorythus estherae
European goldfinch, Carduelis carduelis
Citril finch, Carduelis citrinella
Corsican finch, Carduelis corsicana
European serin, Serinus serinus
Fire-fronted serin, Serinus pusillus
Syrian serin, Serinus syriacus
Tibetan serin, Spinus thibetanus
Eurasian siskin, Spinus spinus
Pine siskin, Spinus pinus (A)

Longspurs and snow buntings
Order: PasseriformesFamily: Calcariidae

The Calcariidae are a group of passerine birds which had been traditionally grouped with the New World sparrows, but differ in a number of respects and are usually found in open grassy areas.

Lapland longspur, Calcarius lapponicus
Snow bunting, Plectrophenax nivalis

Old World buntings
Order: PasseriformesFamily: Emberizidae

The emberizids are a large family of passerine birds. They are seed-eating birds with distinctively shaped bills. Many emberizid species have distinctive head patterns.

Crested bunting, Emberiza lathami
Black-headed bunting, Emberiza melanocephala
Red-headed bunting, Emberiza bruniceps
Corn bunting, Emberiza calandra
Chestnut-eared bunting, Emberiza fucata
Tibetan bunting, Emberiza koslowi
Rufous-backed bunting, Emberiza jankowskii
Rock bunting, Emberiza cia
Godlewski's bunting, Emberiza godlewskii
Meadow bunting, Emberiza cioides
Cirl bunting, Emberiza cirlus
White-capped bunting, Emberiza stewarti
Yellowhammer, Emberiza citrinella
Pine bunting, Emberiza leucocephalos
Gray-necked bunting, Emberiza buchanani
Cinereous bunting, Emberiza cineracea
Ortolan bunting, Emberiza hortulana
Cretzschmar's bunting, Emberiza caesia
Striolated bunting, Emberiza striolata
Slaty bunting, Emberiza siemsseni
Yellow-throated bunting, Emberiza elegans
Ochre-rumped bunting, Emberiza yessoensis
Pallas's bunting, Emberiza pallasi
Reed bunting, Emberiza schoeniclus
Yellow-breasted bunting, Emberiza aureola
Little bunting, Emberiza pusilla
Rustic bunting, Emberiza rustica
Yellow bunting, Emberiza sulphurata
Black-faced bunting, Emberiza spodocephala
Masked bunting, Emberiza personata
Chestnut bunting, Emberiza rutila
Yellow-browed bunting, Emberiza chrysophrys
Tristram's bunting, Emberiza tristrami
Gray bunting, Emberiza variabilis
Socotra bunting, Emberiza socotrana
Cinnamon-breasted bunting, Emberiza tahapisi
House bunting, Emberiza sahari

New World sparrows
Order: PasseriformesFamily: Passerellidae

Until 2017, these species were considered part of the family Emberizidae. Most of the species are known as sparrows, but these birds are not closely related to the Old World sparrows which are in the family Passeridae. Many of these have distinctive head patterns.

Chipping sparrow, Spizella passerina
American tree sparrow, Spizelloides arborea (A)
Fox sparrow, Passerella iliaca
White-crowned sparrow, Zonotrichia leucophrys (A)
Golden-crowned sparrow, Zonotrichia atricapilla
White-throated sparrow, Zonotrichia albicollis
Rufous-collared sparrow, Zonotrichia capensis
Savannah sparrow, Passerculus sandwichensis

Troupials and allies
Order: PasseriformesFamily: Icteridae

The icterids are a group of small to medium-sized, often colourful, passerine birds restricted to the New World and include the grackles, New World blackbirds and New World orioles. Most species have black as the predominant plumage colour, often enlivened by yellow, orange or red.

Rusty blackbird, Euphagus carolinus (A)

New World warblers
Order: PasseriformesFamily: Parulidae

The New World warblers are a group of small, often colourful, passerine birds restricted to the New World. Most are arboreal, but some are terrestrial. Most members of this family are insectivores.

Northern waterthrush, Parkesia noveboracensis (A)

Tanagers and allies
Order: PasseriformesFamily: Thraupidae

The tanagers are a large group of small to medium-sized passerine birds restricted to the New World, mainly in the tropics. Many species are brightly colored. As a family they are omnivorous, but individual species specialize in eating fruits, seeds, insects, or other types of food. Most have short, rounded wings.

Red-crested cardinal, Paroaria coronata (I)

See also
List of birds
Lists of birds by region

References

Clements, James F. (July 2005). Birds of the World: A Checklist fifth edition and supplements. Ibis Publishing. .
 Description of the ABA Listing Areas and Regions from the American Birding Association.
Collinson, Martin (June 2006). "Splitting headaches? Recent taxonomic changes affecting the British and Western Palaearctic lists". British Birds. 99: 306–323.
 Dickinson, E. C. et al. "Systematic notes on Asian Birds". Zoologische Verhandelingen. vols. 331 (2000), 335 (2001), 340 (2002), 344 (2003), 350 (2004) and Zoologische Mededelingen. vols. 80-4 & 80-5 (2006) 

Asia
'